

103001–103100 

|-bgcolor=#E9E9E9
| 103001 ||  || — || December 9, 1999 || Oizumi || T. Kobayashi || — || align=right | 6.2 km || 
|-id=002 bgcolor=#d6d6d6
| 103002 ||  || — || December 7, 1999 || Socorro || LINEAR || — || align=right | 4.0 km || 
|-id=003 bgcolor=#fefefe
| 103003 ||  || — || December 7, 1999 || Socorro || LINEAR || — || align=right | 2.2 km || 
|-id=004 bgcolor=#E9E9E9
| 103004 ||  || — || December 7, 1999 || Socorro || LINEAR || — || align=right | 5.3 km || 
|-id=005 bgcolor=#fefefe
| 103005 ||  || — || December 7, 1999 || Socorro || LINEAR || — || align=right | 1.9 km || 
|-id=006 bgcolor=#E9E9E9
| 103006 ||  || — || December 7, 1999 || Socorro || LINEAR || — || align=right | 4.1 km || 
|-id=007 bgcolor=#E9E9E9
| 103007 ||  || — || December 7, 1999 || Socorro || LINEAR || — || align=right | 4.9 km || 
|-id=008 bgcolor=#fefefe
| 103008 ||  || — || December 7, 1999 || Socorro || LINEAR || — || align=right | 2.7 km || 
|-id=009 bgcolor=#E9E9E9
| 103009 ||  || — || December 7, 1999 || Socorro || LINEAR || — || align=right | 6.1 km || 
|-id=010 bgcolor=#fefefe
| 103010 ||  || — || December 7, 1999 || Socorro || LINEAR || — || align=right | 1.8 km || 
|-id=011 bgcolor=#fefefe
| 103011 ||  || — || December 7, 1999 || Socorro || LINEAR || — || align=right | 1.4 km || 
|-id=012 bgcolor=#d6d6d6
| 103012 ||  || — || December 7, 1999 || Socorro || LINEAR || THM || align=right | 4.6 km || 
|-id=013 bgcolor=#fefefe
| 103013 ||  || — || December 7, 1999 || Socorro || LINEAR || FLO || align=right | 1.6 km || 
|-id=014 bgcolor=#E9E9E9
| 103014 ||  || — || December 9, 1999 || Gekko || T. Kagawa || — || align=right | 4.6 km || 
|-id=015 bgcolor=#fefefe
| 103015 Gianfrancomarcon ||  ||  || December 8, 1999 || Campo Catino || Campo Catino Obs. || — || align=right | 2.4 km || 
|-id=016 bgcolor=#E9E9E9
| 103016 ||  || — || December 8, 1999 || Ondřejov || P. Pravec, P. Kušnirák || — || align=right | 4.2 km || 
|-id=017 bgcolor=#E9E9E9
| 103017 ||  || — || December 11, 1999 || Oaxaca || J. M. Roe || INO || align=right | 2.7 km || 
|-id=018 bgcolor=#fefefe
| 103018 ||  || — || December 11, 1999 || Oizumi || T. Kobayashi || — || align=right | 1.9 km || 
|-id=019 bgcolor=#d6d6d6
| 103019 ||  || — || December 11, 1999 || Prescott || P. G. Comba || — || align=right | 5.0 km || 
|-id=020 bgcolor=#E9E9E9
| 103020 ||  || — || December 4, 1999 || Catalina || CSS || — || align=right | 2.3 km || 
|-id=021 bgcolor=#fefefe
| 103021 ||  || — || December 4, 1999 || Catalina || CSS || — || align=right | 1.8 km || 
|-id=022 bgcolor=#E9E9E9
| 103022 ||  || — || December 4, 1999 || Catalina || CSS || — || align=right | 2.7 km || 
|-id=023 bgcolor=#fefefe
| 103023 ||  || — || December 4, 1999 || Catalina || CSS || NYS || align=right | 1.1 km || 
|-id=024 bgcolor=#fefefe
| 103024 ||  || — || December 4, 1999 || Catalina || CSS || V || align=right | 1.4 km || 
|-id=025 bgcolor=#E9E9E9
| 103025 ||  || — || December 5, 1999 || Catalina || CSS || — || align=right | 3.9 km || 
|-id=026 bgcolor=#E9E9E9
| 103026 ||  || — || December 8, 1999 || Catalina || CSS || — || align=right | 3.5 km || 
|-id=027 bgcolor=#d6d6d6
| 103027 ||  || — || December 11, 1999 || Socorro || LINEAR || 7:4 || align=right | 12 km || 
|-id=028 bgcolor=#E9E9E9
| 103028 ||  || — || December 11, 1999 || Socorro || LINEAR || — || align=right | 3.3 km || 
|-id=029 bgcolor=#fefefe
| 103029 ||  || — || December 11, 1999 || Socorro || LINEAR || — || align=right | 4.4 km || 
|-id=030 bgcolor=#d6d6d6
| 103030 ||  || — || December 4, 1999 || Catalina || CSS || — || align=right | 4.8 km || 
|-id=031 bgcolor=#E9E9E9
| 103031 ||  || — || December 4, 1999 || Catalina || CSS || — || align=right | 2.0 km || 
|-id=032 bgcolor=#E9E9E9
| 103032 ||  || — || December 5, 1999 || Catalina || CSS || — || align=right | 3.2 km || 
|-id=033 bgcolor=#E9E9E9
| 103033 ||  || — || December 5, 1999 || Catalina || CSS || — || align=right | 2.3 km || 
|-id=034 bgcolor=#fefefe
| 103034 ||  || — || December 5, 1999 || Catalina || CSS || — || align=right | 2.0 km || 
|-id=035 bgcolor=#fefefe
| 103035 ||  || — || December 5, 1999 || Catalina || CSS || — || align=right | 1.5 km || 
|-id=036 bgcolor=#fefefe
| 103036 ||  || — || December 5, 1999 || Catalina || CSS || NYS || align=right | 1.6 km || 
|-id=037 bgcolor=#E9E9E9
| 103037 ||  || — || December 5, 1999 || Catalina || CSS || — || align=right | 2.6 km || 
|-id=038 bgcolor=#E9E9E9
| 103038 ||  || — || December 5, 1999 || Catalina || CSS || — || align=right | 3.4 km || 
|-id=039 bgcolor=#fefefe
| 103039 ||  || — || December 5, 1999 || Catalina || CSS || V || align=right | 1.6 km || 
|-id=040 bgcolor=#E9E9E9
| 103040 ||  || — || December 5, 1999 || Catalina || CSS || — || align=right | 4.4 km || 
|-id=041 bgcolor=#E9E9E9
| 103041 ||  || — || December 5, 1999 || Catalina || CSS || — || align=right | 4.9 km || 
|-id=042 bgcolor=#fefefe
| 103042 ||  || — || December 7, 1999 || Catalina || CSS || V || align=right | 2.2 km || 
|-id=043 bgcolor=#fefefe
| 103043 ||  || — || December 7, 1999 || Catalina || CSS || V || align=right | 1.8 km || 
|-id=044 bgcolor=#fefefe
| 103044 ||  || — || December 7, 1999 || Catalina || CSS || — || align=right | 3.3 km || 
|-id=045 bgcolor=#fefefe
| 103045 ||  || — || December 7, 1999 || Socorro || LINEAR || NYS || align=right | 1.2 km || 
|-id=046 bgcolor=#E9E9E9
| 103046 ||  || — || December 12, 1999 || Socorro || LINEAR || — || align=right | 3.1 km || 
|-id=047 bgcolor=#E9E9E9
| 103047 ||  || — || December 12, 1999 || Socorro || LINEAR || — || align=right | 6.6 km || 
|-id=048 bgcolor=#fefefe
| 103048 ||  || — || December 12, 1999 || Socorro || LINEAR || — || align=right | 2.1 km || 
|-id=049 bgcolor=#E9E9E9
| 103049 ||  || — || December 12, 1999 || Socorro || LINEAR || — || align=right | 3.1 km || 
|-id=050 bgcolor=#E9E9E9
| 103050 ||  || — || December 12, 1999 || Socorro || LINEAR || EUN || align=right | 2.9 km || 
|-id=051 bgcolor=#fefefe
| 103051 ||  || — || December 12, 1999 || Socorro || LINEAR || — || align=right | 1.4 km || 
|-id=052 bgcolor=#E9E9E9
| 103052 ||  || — || December 12, 1999 || Socorro || LINEAR || PAE || align=right | 5.0 km || 
|-id=053 bgcolor=#fefefe
| 103053 ||  || — || December 12, 1999 || Socorro || LINEAR || — || align=right | 2.2 km || 
|-id=054 bgcolor=#E9E9E9
| 103054 ||  || — || December 12, 1999 || Socorro || LINEAR || ADE || align=right | 5.9 km || 
|-id=055 bgcolor=#E9E9E9
| 103055 ||  || — || December 5, 1999 || Socorro || LINEAR || HNS || align=right | 2.8 km || 
|-id=056 bgcolor=#E9E9E9
| 103056 ||  || — || December 5, 1999 || Socorro || LINEAR || BAR || align=right | 2.9 km || 
|-id=057 bgcolor=#fefefe
| 103057 ||  || — || December 8, 1999 || Socorro || LINEAR || FLO || align=right | 1.2 km || 
|-id=058 bgcolor=#fefefe
| 103058 ||  || — || December 8, 1999 || Socorro || LINEAR || — || align=right | 1.6 km || 
|-id=059 bgcolor=#fefefe
| 103059 ||  || — || December 14, 1999 || Fountain Hills || C. W. Juels || — || align=right | 4.7 km || 
|-id=060 bgcolor=#fefefe
| 103060 ||  || — || December 5, 1999 || Anderson Mesa || LONEOS || PHO || align=right | 4.4 km || 
|-id=061 bgcolor=#fefefe
| 103061 ||  || — || December 5, 1999 || Kitt Peak || Spacewatch || — || align=right | 1.9 km || 
|-id=062 bgcolor=#E9E9E9
| 103062 ||  || — || December 2, 1999 || Kitt Peak || Spacewatch || — || align=right | 2.4 km || 
|-id=063 bgcolor=#E9E9E9
| 103063 ||  || — || December 2, 1999 || Kitt Peak || Spacewatch || — || align=right | 1.8 km || 
|-id=064 bgcolor=#fefefe
| 103064 ||  || — || December 3, 1999 || Kitt Peak || Spacewatch || — || align=right | 1.3 km || 
|-id=065 bgcolor=#fefefe
| 103065 ||  || — || December 4, 1999 || Kitt Peak || Spacewatch || — || align=right | 1.8 km || 
|-id=066 bgcolor=#FA8072
| 103066 ||  || — || December 15, 1999 || Kitt Peak || Spacewatch || — || align=right data-sort-value="0.82" | 820 m || 
|-id=067 bgcolor=#FFC2E0
| 103067 ||  || — || December 14, 1999 || Socorro || LINEAR || APO +1kmPHA || align=right | 1.3 km || 
|-id=068 bgcolor=#fefefe
| 103068 ||  || — || December 7, 1999 || Kitt Peak || Spacewatch || — || align=right | 1.4 km || 
|-id=069 bgcolor=#fefefe
| 103069 ||  || — || December 7, 1999 || Kitt Peak || Spacewatch || V || align=right | 1.2 km || 
|-id=070 bgcolor=#fefefe
| 103070 ||  || — || December 7, 1999 || Kitt Peak || Spacewatch || — || align=right | 1.6 km || 
|-id=071 bgcolor=#fefefe
| 103071 ||  || — || December 8, 1999 || Kitt Peak || Spacewatch || V || align=right data-sort-value="0.97" | 970 m || 
|-id=072 bgcolor=#E9E9E9
| 103072 ||  || — || December 13, 1999 || Anderson Mesa || LONEOS || — || align=right | 3.2 km || 
|-id=073 bgcolor=#E9E9E9
| 103073 ||  || — || December 7, 1999 || Kitt Peak || Spacewatch || — || align=right | 2.5 km || 
|-id=074 bgcolor=#fefefe
| 103074 ||  || — || December 7, 1999 || Kitt Peak || Spacewatch || FLO || align=right | 1.6 km || 
|-id=075 bgcolor=#E9E9E9
| 103075 ||  || — || December 8, 1999 || Kitt Peak || Spacewatch || DOR || align=right | 3.3 km || 
|-id=076 bgcolor=#d6d6d6
| 103076 ||  || — || December 13, 1999 || Anderson Mesa || LONEOS || — || align=right | 10 km || 
|-id=077 bgcolor=#fefefe
| 103077 ||  || — || December 7, 1999 || Socorro || LINEAR || — || align=right | 1.8 km || 
|-id=078 bgcolor=#E9E9E9
| 103078 ||  || — || December 8, 1999 || Socorro || LINEAR || — || align=right | 1.8 km || 
|-id=079 bgcolor=#E9E9E9
| 103079 ||  || — || December 8, 1999 || Socorro || LINEAR || — || align=right | 2.8 km || 
|-id=080 bgcolor=#fefefe
| 103080 ||  || — || December 8, 1999 || Socorro || LINEAR || NYS || align=right | 3.0 km || 
|-id=081 bgcolor=#fefefe
| 103081 ||  || — || December 8, 1999 || Socorro || LINEAR || — || align=right | 1.1 km || 
|-id=082 bgcolor=#E9E9E9
| 103082 ||  || — || December 8, 1999 || Socorro || LINEAR || MAR || align=right | 3.2 km || 
|-id=083 bgcolor=#fefefe
| 103083 ||  || — || December 8, 1999 || Socorro || LINEAR || V || align=right | 1.8 km || 
|-id=084 bgcolor=#fefefe
| 103084 ||  || — || December 8, 1999 || Socorro || LINEAR || NYS || align=right | 1.4 km || 
|-id=085 bgcolor=#E9E9E9
| 103085 ||  || — || December 12, 1999 || Socorro || LINEAR || — || align=right | 3.8 km || 
|-id=086 bgcolor=#E9E9E9
| 103086 ||  || — || December 13, 1999 || Socorro || LINEAR || ADE || align=right | 6.1 km || 
|-id=087 bgcolor=#fefefe
| 103087 ||  || — || December 8, 1999 || Kitt Peak || Spacewatch || NYS || align=right | 1.3 km || 
|-id=088 bgcolor=#d6d6d6
| 103088 ||  || — || December 8, 1999 || Kitt Peak || Spacewatch || — || align=right | 4.0 km || 
|-id=089 bgcolor=#E9E9E9
| 103089 ||  || — || December 8, 1999 || Kitt Peak || Spacewatch || HEN || align=right | 2.0 km || 
|-id=090 bgcolor=#E9E9E9
| 103090 ||  || — || December 8, 1999 || Kitt Peak || Spacewatch || — || align=right | 5.5 km || 
|-id=091 bgcolor=#fefefe
| 103091 ||  || — || December 8, 1999 || Socorro || LINEAR || PHO || align=right | 3.0 km || 
|-id=092 bgcolor=#fefefe
| 103092 ||  || — || December 8, 1999 || Socorro || LINEAR || — || align=right | 2.4 km || 
|-id=093 bgcolor=#E9E9E9
| 103093 ||  || — || December 10, 1999 || Socorro || LINEAR || — || align=right | 6.5 km || 
|-id=094 bgcolor=#E9E9E9
| 103094 ||  || — || December 10, 1999 || Socorro || LINEAR || — || align=right | 4.9 km || 
|-id=095 bgcolor=#E9E9E9
| 103095 ||  || — || December 10, 1999 || Socorro || LINEAR || — || align=right | 2.2 km || 
|-id=096 bgcolor=#fefefe
| 103096 ||  || — || December 10, 1999 || Socorro || LINEAR || — || align=right | 1.9 km || 
|-id=097 bgcolor=#E9E9E9
| 103097 ||  || — || December 10, 1999 || Socorro || LINEAR || — || align=right | 2.2 km || 
|-id=098 bgcolor=#fefefe
| 103098 ||  || — || December 10, 1999 || Socorro || LINEAR || — || align=right | 1.8 km || 
|-id=099 bgcolor=#fefefe
| 103099 ||  || — || December 10, 1999 || Socorro || LINEAR || — || align=right | 1.9 km || 
|-id=100 bgcolor=#E9E9E9
| 103100 ||  || — || December 10, 1999 || Socorro || LINEAR || POS || align=right | 7.1 km || 
|}

103101–103200 

|-bgcolor=#fefefe
| 103101 ||  || — || December 10, 1999 || Socorro || LINEAR || — || align=right | 1.5 km || 
|-id=102 bgcolor=#fefefe
| 103102 ||  || — || December 10, 1999 || Socorro || LINEAR || — || align=right | 1.8 km || 
|-id=103 bgcolor=#E9E9E9
| 103103 ||  || — || December 10, 1999 || Socorro || LINEAR || — || align=right | 6.4 km || 
|-id=104 bgcolor=#E9E9E9
| 103104 ||  || — || December 10, 1999 || Socorro || LINEAR || — || align=right | 4.3 km || 
|-id=105 bgcolor=#fefefe
| 103105 ||  || — || December 10, 1999 || Socorro || LINEAR || — || align=right | 1.9 km || 
|-id=106 bgcolor=#E9E9E9
| 103106 ||  || — || December 10, 1999 || Socorro || LINEAR || PAE || align=right | 6.0 km || 
|-id=107 bgcolor=#fefefe
| 103107 ||  || — || December 10, 1999 || Socorro || LINEAR || — || align=right | 4.3 km || 
|-id=108 bgcolor=#E9E9E9
| 103108 ||  || — || December 10, 1999 || Socorro || LINEAR || — || align=right | 7.9 km || 
|-id=109 bgcolor=#E9E9E9
| 103109 ||  || — || December 10, 1999 || Socorro || LINEAR || — || align=right | 2.7 km || 
|-id=110 bgcolor=#E9E9E9
| 103110 ||  || — || December 10, 1999 || Socorro || LINEAR || — || align=right | 1.8 km || 
|-id=111 bgcolor=#fefefe
| 103111 ||  || — || December 10, 1999 || Socorro || LINEAR || — || align=right | 1.6 km || 
|-id=112 bgcolor=#E9E9E9
| 103112 ||  || — || December 10, 1999 || Socorro || LINEAR || — || align=right | 5.1 km || 
|-id=113 bgcolor=#E9E9E9
| 103113 ||  || — || December 10, 1999 || Socorro || LINEAR || HNS || align=right | 2.4 km || 
|-id=114 bgcolor=#fefefe
| 103114 ||  || — || December 10, 1999 || Socorro || LINEAR || — || align=right | 2.1 km || 
|-id=115 bgcolor=#E9E9E9
| 103115 ||  || — || December 10, 1999 || Socorro || LINEAR || — || align=right | 4.0 km || 
|-id=116 bgcolor=#E9E9E9
| 103116 ||  || — || December 12, 1999 || Socorro || LINEAR || — || align=right | 4.0 km || 
|-id=117 bgcolor=#E9E9E9
| 103117 ||  || — || December 12, 1999 || Socorro || LINEAR || — || align=right | 5.2 km || 
|-id=118 bgcolor=#E9E9E9
| 103118 ||  || — || December 12, 1999 || Socorro || LINEAR || — || align=right | 5.5 km || 
|-id=119 bgcolor=#E9E9E9
| 103119 ||  || — || December 12, 1999 || Socorro || LINEAR || — || align=right | 5.8 km || 
|-id=120 bgcolor=#E9E9E9
| 103120 ||  || — || December 12, 1999 || Socorro || LINEAR || — || align=right | 3.9 km || 
|-id=121 bgcolor=#E9E9E9
| 103121 ||  || — || December 12, 1999 || Socorro || LINEAR || EUN || align=right | 4.3 km || 
|-id=122 bgcolor=#E9E9E9
| 103122 ||  || — || December 12, 1999 || Socorro || LINEAR || MIT || align=right | 5.1 km || 
|-id=123 bgcolor=#E9E9E9
| 103123 ||  || — || December 12, 1999 || Socorro || LINEAR || DOR || align=right | 6.3 km || 
|-id=124 bgcolor=#E9E9E9
| 103124 ||  || — || December 12, 1999 || Socorro || LINEAR || — || align=right | 4.8 km || 
|-id=125 bgcolor=#fefefe
| 103125 ||  || — || December 12, 1999 || Socorro || LINEAR || FLO || align=right | 3.5 km || 
|-id=126 bgcolor=#fefefe
| 103126 ||  || — || December 12, 1999 || Socorro || LINEAR || — || align=right | 1.8 km || 
|-id=127 bgcolor=#fefefe
| 103127 ||  || — || December 12, 1999 || Socorro || LINEAR || — || align=right | 2.0 km || 
|-id=128 bgcolor=#fefefe
| 103128 ||  || — || December 12, 1999 || Socorro || LINEAR || — || align=right | 1.6 km || 
|-id=129 bgcolor=#fefefe
| 103129 ||  || — || December 12, 1999 || Socorro || LINEAR || FLO || align=right | 1.8 km || 
|-id=130 bgcolor=#E9E9E9
| 103130 ||  || — || December 12, 1999 || Socorro || LINEAR || — || align=right | 7.1 km || 
|-id=131 bgcolor=#fefefe
| 103131 ||  || — || December 12, 1999 || Socorro || LINEAR || — || align=right | 1.7 km || 
|-id=132 bgcolor=#fefefe
| 103132 ||  || — || December 12, 1999 || Socorro || LINEAR || V || align=right | 1.6 km || 
|-id=133 bgcolor=#E9E9E9
| 103133 ||  || — || December 12, 1999 || Socorro || LINEAR || PAD || align=right | 4.4 km || 
|-id=134 bgcolor=#fefefe
| 103134 ||  || — || December 12, 1999 || Socorro || LINEAR || V || align=right | 1.8 km || 
|-id=135 bgcolor=#fefefe
| 103135 ||  || — || December 12, 1999 || Socorro || LINEAR || V || align=right | 1.5 km || 
|-id=136 bgcolor=#E9E9E9
| 103136 ||  || — || December 12, 1999 || Socorro || LINEAR || — || align=right | 6.1 km || 
|-id=137 bgcolor=#fefefe
| 103137 ||  || — || December 12, 1999 || Socorro || LINEAR || V || align=right | 1.2 km || 
|-id=138 bgcolor=#fefefe
| 103138 ||  || — || December 12, 1999 || Socorro || LINEAR || — || align=right | 1.9 km || 
|-id=139 bgcolor=#E9E9E9
| 103139 ||  || — || December 12, 1999 || Socorro || LINEAR || — || align=right | 4.3 km || 
|-id=140 bgcolor=#E9E9E9
| 103140 ||  || — || December 12, 1999 || Socorro || LINEAR || — || align=right | 4.6 km || 
|-id=141 bgcolor=#E9E9E9
| 103141 ||  || — || December 12, 1999 || Socorro || LINEAR || — || align=right | 6.3 km || 
|-id=142 bgcolor=#E9E9E9
| 103142 ||  || — || December 12, 1999 || Socorro || LINEAR || EUN || align=right | 7.0 km || 
|-id=143 bgcolor=#E9E9E9
| 103143 ||  || — || December 13, 1999 || Socorro || LINEAR || — || align=right | 2.5 km || 
|-id=144 bgcolor=#E9E9E9
| 103144 ||  || — || December 13, 1999 || Socorro || LINEAR || — || align=right | 3.2 km || 
|-id=145 bgcolor=#E9E9E9
| 103145 ||  || — || December 13, 1999 || Socorro || LINEAR || — || align=right | 5.4 km || 
|-id=146 bgcolor=#E9E9E9
| 103146 ||  || — || December 13, 1999 || Socorro || LINEAR || — || align=right | 2.5 km || 
|-id=147 bgcolor=#E9E9E9
| 103147 ||  || — || December 14, 1999 || Socorro || LINEAR || — || align=right | 3.4 km || 
|-id=148 bgcolor=#fefefe
| 103148 ||  || — || December 14, 1999 || Socorro || LINEAR || FLO || align=right | 1.4 km || 
|-id=149 bgcolor=#E9E9E9
| 103149 ||  || — || December 14, 1999 || Socorro || LINEAR || — || align=right | 5.0 km || 
|-id=150 bgcolor=#E9E9E9
| 103150 ||  || — || December 14, 1999 || Socorro || LINEAR || — || align=right | 5.5 km || 
|-id=151 bgcolor=#E9E9E9
| 103151 ||  || — || December 13, 1999 || Kitt Peak || Spacewatch || — || align=right | 2.6 km || 
|-id=152 bgcolor=#E9E9E9
| 103152 ||  || — || December 14, 1999 || Socorro || LINEAR || — || align=right | 2.2 km || 
|-id=153 bgcolor=#fefefe
| 103153 ||  || — || December 14, 1999 || Socorro || LINEAR || — || align=right | 1.5 km || 
|-id=154 bgcolor=#E9E9E9
| 103154 ||  || — || December 15, 1999 || Socorro || LINEAR || EUN || align=right | 2.3 km || 
|-id=155 bgcolor=#E9E9E9
| 103155 ||  || — || December 15, 1999 || Socorro || LINEAR || — || align=right | 2.4 km || 
|-id=156 bgcolor=#E9E9E9
| 103156 ||  || — || December 15, 1999 || Socorro || LINEAR || — || align=right | 3.9 km || 
|-id=157 bgcolor=#E9E9E9
| 103157 ||  || — || December 13, 1999 || Kitt Peak || Spacewatch || — || align=right | 3.4 km || 
|-id=158 bgcolor=#E9E9E9
| 103158 ||  || — || December 13, 1999 || Kitt Peak || Spacewatch || — || align=right | 1.5 km || 
|-id=159 bgcolor=#d6d6d6
| 103159 ||  || — || December 13, 1999 || Kitt Peak || Spacewatch || KOR || align=right | 2.8 km || 
|-id=160 bgcolor=#E9E9E9
| 103160 ||  || — || December 13, 1999 || Kitt Peak || Spacewatch || — || align=right | 4.2 km || 
|-id=161 bgcolor=#FA8072
| 103161 ||  || — || December 13, 1999 || Kitt Peak || Spacewatch || — || align=right | 1.7 km || 
|-id=162 bgcolor=#fefefe
| 103162 ||  || — || December 13, 1999 || Kitt Peak || Spacewatch || — || align=right | 1.7 km || 
|-id=163 bgcolor=#E9E9E9
| 103163 ||  || — || December 14, 1999 || Kitt Peak || Spacewatch || — || align=right | 1.9 km || 
|-id=164 bgcolor=#fefefe
| 103164 ||  || — || December 15, 1999 || Kitt Peak || Spacewatch || FLO || align=right | 2.1 km || 
|-id=165 bgcolor=#fefefe
| 103165 ||  || — || December 15, 1999 || Kitt Peak || Spacewatch || — || align=right | 1.8 km || 
|-id=166 bgcolor=#E9E9E9
| 103166 ||  || — || December 15, 1999 || Kitt Peak || Spacewatch || — || align=right | 1.4 km || 
|-id=167 bgcolor=#fefefe
| 103167 ||  || — || December 14, 1999 || Kitt Peak || Spacewatch || — || align=right | 3.6 km || 
|-id=168 bgcolor=#fefefe
| 103168 ||  || — || December 14, 1999 || Kitt Peak || Spacewatch || FLO || align=right data-sort-value="0.94" | 940 m || 
|-id=169 bgcolor=#E9E9E9
| 103169 ||  || — || December 7, 1999 || Catalina || CSS || EUN || align=right | 2.3 km || 
|-id=170 bgcolor=#E9E9E9
| 103170 ||  || — || December 7, 1999 || Anderson Mesa || LONEOS || EUN || align=right | 3.0 km || 
|-id=171 bgcolor=#E9E9E9
| 103171 ||  || — || December 7, 1999 || Catalina || CSS || — || align=right | 3.5 km || 
|-id=172 bgcolor=#E9E9E9
| 103172 ||  || — || December 8, 1999 || Catalina || CSS || — || align=right | 6.1 km || 
|-id=173 bgcolor=#FA8072
| 103173 ||  || — || December 4, 1999 || Anderson Mesa || LONEOS || — || align=right | 1.8 km || 
|-id=174 bgcolor=#E9E9E9
| 103174 ||  || — || December 4, 1999 || Anderson Mesa || LONEOS || EUN || align=right | 2.3 km || 
|-id=175 bgcolor=#E9E9E9
| 103175 ||  || — || December 3, 1999 || Anderson Mesa || LONEOS || — || align=right | 4.9 km || 
|-id=176 bgcolor=#fefefe
| 103176 ||  || — || December 3, 1999 || Anderson Mesa || LONEOS || ERI || align=right | 4.2 km || 
|-id=177 bgcolor=#E9E9E9
| 103177 ||  || — || December 3, 1999 || Anderson Mesa || LONEOS || — || align=right | 2.2 km || 
|-id=178 bgcolor=#fefefe
| 103178 ||  || — || December 2, 1999 || Kitt Peak || Spacewatch || — || align=right | 1.0 km || 
|-id=179 bgcolor=#d6d6d6
| 103179 ||  || — || December 5, 1999 || Anderson Mesa || LONEOS || EOS || align=right | 4.8 km || 
|-id=180 bgcolor=#fefefe
| 103180 ||  || — || December 5, 1999 || Catalina || CSS || — || align=right | 2.1 km || 
|-id=181 bgcolor=#fefefe
| 103181 ||  || — || December 5, 1999 || Catalina || CSS || — || align=right | 1.6 km || 
|-id=182 bgcolor=#E9E9E9
| 103182 ||  || — || December 2, 1999 || Kitt Peak || Spacewatch || — || align=right | 3.0 km || 
|-id=183 bgcolor=#E9E9E9
| 103183 ||  || — || December 6, 1999 || Kitt Peak || Spacewatch || — || align=right | 1.8 km || 
|-id=184 bgcolor=#E9E9E9
| 103184 ||  || — || December 6, 1999 || Socorro || LINEAR || — || align=right | 3.4 km || 
|-id=185 bgcolor=#fefefe
| 103185 ||  || — || December 13, 1999 || Catalina || CSS || — || align=right | 2.0 km || 
|-id=186 bgcolor=#E9E9E9
| 103186 ||  || — || December 13, 1999 || Anderson Mesa || LONEOS || — || align=right | 6.9 km || 
|-id=187 bgcolor=#E9E9E9
| 103187 ||  || — || December 13, 1999 || Socorro || LINEAR || — || align=right | 3.7 km || 
|-id=188 bgcolor=#E9E9E9
| 103188 ||  || — || December 13, 1999 || Socorro || LINEAR || — || align=right | 3.5 km || 
|-id=189 bgcolor=#E9E9E9
| 103189 ||  || — || December 13, 1999 || Socorro || LINEAR || EUN || align=right | 4.0 km || 
|-id=190 bgcolor=#E9E9E9
| 103190 ||  || — || December 2, 1999 || Socorro || LINEAR || EUN || align=right | 2.9 km || 
|-id=191 bgcolor=#E9E9E9
| 103191 ||  || — || December 3, 1999 || Anderson Mesa || LONEOS || — || align=right | 3.1 km || 
|-id=192 bgcolor=#fefefe
| 103192 ||  || — || December 5, 1999 || Anderson Mesa || LONEOS || — || align=right | 2.3 km || 
|-id=193 bgcolor=#E9E9E9
| 103193 ||  || — || December 5, 1999 || Anderson Mesa || LONEOS || — || align=right | 4.7 km || 
|-id=194 bgcolor=#fefefe
| 103194 ||  || — || December 5, 1999 || Anderson Mesa || LONEOS || PHO || align=right | 2.3 km || 
|-id=195 bgcolor=#E9E9E9
| 103195 ||  || — || December 5, 1999 || Anderson Mesa || LONEOS || — || align=right | 2.9 km || 
|-id=196 bgcolor=#E9E9E9
| 103196 ||  || — || December 5, 1999 || Anderson Mesa || LONEOS || HNS || align=right | 4.1 km || 
|-id=197 bgcolor=#E9E9E9
| 103197 ||  || — || December 6, 1999 || Socorro || LINEAR || — || align=right | 2.2 km || 
|-id=198 bgcolor=#fefefe
| 103198 ||  || — || December 6, 1999 || Socorro || LINEAR || — || align=right | 1.7 km || 
|-id=199 bgcolor=#E9E9E9
| 103199 ||  || — || December 6, 1999 || Socorro || LINEAR || — || align=right | 3.8 km || 
|-id=200 bgcolor=#E9E9E9
| 103200 ||  || — || December 6, 1999 || Socorro || LINEAR || — || align=right | 1.9 km || 
|}

103201–103300 

|-bgcolor=#E9E9E9
| 103201 ||  || — || December 6, 1999 || Socorro || LINEAR || DOR || align=right | 5.6 km || 
|-id=202 bgcolor=#E9E9E9
| 103202 ||  || — || December 5, 1999 || Kitt Peak || Spacewatch || AEO || align=right | 2.5 km || 
|-id=203 bgcolor=#fefefe
| 103203 ||  || — || December 9, 1999 || Kitt Peak || Spacewatch || — || align=right | 1.2 km || 
|-id=204 bgcolor=#fefefe
| 103204 ||  || — || December 9, 1999 || Kitt Peak || Spacewatch || V || align=right data-sort-value="0.93" | 930 m || 
|-id=205 bgcolor=#d6d6d6
| 103205 ||  || — || December 9, 1999 || Kitt Peak || Spacewatch || — || align=right | 3.8 km || 
|-id=206 bgcolor=#fefefe
| 103206 ||  || — || December 12, 1999 || Kitt Peak || Spacewatch || NYS || align=right | 1.2 km || 
|-id=207 bgcolor=#fefefe
| 103207 ||  || — || December 12, 1999 || Kitt Peak || Spacewatch || — || align=right | 1.7 km || 
|-id=208 bgcolor=#fefefe
| 103208 ||  || — || December 12, 1999 || Kitt Peak || Spacewatch || — || align=right | 1.7 km || 
|-id=209 bgcolor=#E9E9E9
| 103209 ||  || — || December 7, 1999 || Catalina || CSS || — || align=right | 5.3 km || 
|-id=210 bgcolor=#E9E9E9
| 103210 ||  || — || December 7, 1999 || Socorro || LINEAR || — || align=right | 3.6 km || 
|-id=211 bgcolor=#E9E9E9
| 103211 ||  || — || December 8, 1999 || Kitt Peak || Spacewatch || — || align=right | 5.1 km || 
|-id=212 bgcolor=#E9E9E9
| 103212 ||  || — || December 6, 1999 || Socorro || LINEAR || MRX || align=right | 2.5 km || 
|-id=213 bgcolor=#fefefe
| 103213 ||  || — || December 5, 1999 || Anderson Mesa || LONEOS || PHO || align=right | 3.3 km || 
|-id=214 bgcolor=#E9E9E9
| 103214 ||  || — || December 8, 1999 || Socorro || LINEAR || — || align=right | 3.6 km || 
|-id=215 bgcolor=#fefefe
| 103215 ||  || — || December 8, 1999 || Socorro || LINEAR || — || align=right | 1.4 km || 
|-id=216 bgcolor=#E9E9E9
| 103216 ||  || — || December 4, 1999 || Anderson Mesa || LONEOS || — || align=right | 4.4 km || 
|-id=217 bgcolor=#fefefe
| 103217 ||  || — || December 17, 1999 || Socorro || LINEAR || — || align=right | 3.0 km || 
|-id=218 bgcolor=#fefefe
| 103218 ||  || — || December 16, 1999 || Kitt Peak || Spacewatch || — || align=right | 1.5 km || 
|-id=219 bgcolor=#E9E9E9
| 103219 ||  || — || December 19, 1999 || Socorro || LINEAR || HNS || align=right | 2.6 km || 
|-id=220 bgcolor=#E9E9E9
| 103220 Kwongchuikuen ||  ||  || December 28, 1999 || Rock Finder || W. K. Y. Yeung || — || align=right | 3.7 km || 
|-id=221 bgcolor=#E9E9E9
| 103221 ||  || — || December 29, 1999 || Baton Rouge || W. R. Cooney Jr. || — || align=right | 2.6 km || 
|-id=222 bgcolor=#fefefe
| 103222 ||  || — || December 29, 1999 || Baton Rouge || W. R. Cooney Jr. || — || align=right | 1.5 km || 
|-id=223 bgcolor=#E9E9E9
| 103223 ||  || — || December 30, 1999 || Socorro || LINEAR || — || align=right | 2.8 km || 
|-id=224 bgcolor=#d6d6d6
| 103224 ||  || — || December 27, 1999 || Kitt Peak || Spacewatch || — || align=right | 4.9 km || 
|-id=225 bgcolor=#fefefe
| 103225 ||  || — || December 27, 1999 || Kitt Peak || Spacewatch || — || align=right | 1.5 km || 
|-id=226 bgcolor=#fefefe
| 103226 ||  || — || December 31, 1999 || Višnjan Observatory || K. Korlević || H || align=right | 1.6 km || 
|-id=227 bgcolor=#E9E9E9
| 103227 ||  || — || December 27, 1999 || Kitt Peak || Spacewatch || — || align=right | 2.4 km || 
|-id=228 bgcolor=#fefefe
| 103228 ||  || — || December 31, 1999 || Višnjan Observatory || K. Korlević || — || align=right | 1.8 km || 
|-id=229 bgcolor=#fefefe
| 103229 ||  || — || December 27, 1999 || Kitt Peak || Spacewatch || — || align=right | 1.3 km || 
|-id=230 bgcolor=#fefefe
| 103230 ||  || — || December 31, 1999 || Kitt Peak || Spacewatch || — || align=right | 1.7 km || 
|-id=231 bgcolor=#fefefe
| 103231 ||  || — || December 31, 1999 || Kitt Peak || Spacewatch || — || align=right | 1.0 km || 
|-id=232 bgcolor=#E9E9E9
| 103232 ||  || — || December 31, 1999 || Kitt Peak || Spacewatch || JUN || align=right | 2.6 km || 
|-id=233 bgcolor=#fefefe
| 103233 ||  || — || December 31, 1999 || Kitt Peak || Spacewatch || NYS || align=right | 1.0 km || 
|-id=234 bgcolor=#fefefe
| 103234 ||  || — || December 30, 1999 || Mauna Kea || C. Veillet || — || align=right | 1.7 km || 
|-id=235 bgcolor=#E9E9E9
| 103235 ||  || — || December 30, 1999 || Socorro || LINEAR || — || align=right | 4.8 km || 
|-id=236 bgcolor=#fefefe
| 103236 ||  || — || December 27, 1999 || Kitt Peak || Spacewatch || — || align=right | 1.5 km || 
|-id=237 bgcolor=#E9E9E9
| 103237 ||  || — || December 30, 1999 || Socorro || LINEAR || MAR || align=right | 3.8 km || 
|-id=238 bgcolor=#E9E9E9
| 103238 ||  || — || December 17, 1999 || Socorro || LINEAR || — || align=right | 2.5 km || 
|-id=239 bgcolor=#E9E9E9
| 103239 || 2000 AS || — || January 2, 2000 || Kitt Peak || Spacewatch || — || align=right | 2.4 km || 
|-id=240 bgcolor=#d6d6d6
| 103240 ||  || — || January 2, 2000 || Kitt Peak || Spacewatch || — || align=right | 4.4 km || 
|-id=241 bgcolor=#E9E9E9
| 103241 ||  || — || January 3, 2000 || Oizumi || T. Kobayashi || — || align=right | 6.4 km || 
|-id=242 bgcolor=#fefefe
| 103242 ||  || — || January 2, 2000 || Socorro || LINEAR || — || align=right | 3.5 km || 
|-id=243 bgcolor=#E9E9E9
| 103243 ||  || — || January 3, 2000 || Socorro || LINEAR || — || align=right | 5.6 km || 
|-id=244 bgcolor=#fefefe
| 103244 ||  || — || January 3, 2000 || Kitt Peak || Spacewatch || V || align=right | 1.1 km || 
|-id=245 bgcolor=#E9E9E9
| 103245 ||  || — || January 3, 2000 || Kitt Peak || Spacewatch || — || align=right | 4.7 km || 
|-id=246 bgcolor=#E9E9E9
| 103246 ||  || — || January 3, 2000 || Farra d'Isonzo || Farra d'Isonzo || — || align=right | 4.6 km || 
|-id=247 bgcolor=#fefefe
| 103247 ||  || — || January 3, 2000 || Višnjan Observatory || K. Korlević || FLO || align=right | 2.1 km || 
|-id=248 bgcolor=#fefefe
| 103248 ||  || — || January 2, 2000 || San Marcello || A. Boattini, M. Tombelli || — || align=right | 1.7 km || 
|-id=249 bgcolor=#E9E9E9
| 103249 ||  || — || January 3, 2000 || San Marcello || A. Boattini, G. Forti || — || align=right | 3.6 km || 
|-id=250 bgcolor=#E9E9E9
| 103250 ||  || — || January 2, 2000 || Socorro || LINEAR || — || align=right | 4.6 km || 
|-id=251 bgcolor=#fefefe
| 103251 ||  || — || January 2, 2000 || Socorro || LINEAR || — || align=right | 2.0 km || 
|-id=252 bgcolor=#fefefe
| 103252 ||  || — || January 2, 2000 || Socorro || LINEAR || — || align=right | 1.7 km || 
|-id=253 bgcolor=#E9E9E9
| 103253 ||  || — || January 3, 2000 || Socorro || LINEAR || — || align=right | 4.4 km || 
|-id=254 bgcolor=#fefefe
| 103254 ||  || — || January 3, 2000 || Socorro || LINEAR || — || align=right | 1.5 km || 
|-id=255 bgcolor=#E9E9E9
| 103255 ||  || — || January 3, 2000 || Socorro || LINEAR || — || align=right | 3.6 km || 
|-id=256 bgcolor=#fefefe
| 103256 ||  || — || January 3, 2000 || Socorro || LINEAR || — || align=right | 4.6 km || 
|-id=257 bgcolor=#fefefe
| 103257 ||  || — || January 3, 2000 || Socorro || LINEAR || — || align=right | 1.8 km || 
|-id=258 bgcolor=#fefefe
| 103258 ||  || — || January 3, 2000 || Socorro || LINEAR || — || align=right | 2.0 km || 
|-id=259 bgcolor=#E9E9E9
| 103259 ||  || — || January 3, 2000 || Socorro || LINEAR || MRX || align=right | 2.9 km || 
|-id=260 bgcolor=#d6d6d6
| 103260 ||  || — || January 3, 2000 || Socorro || LINEAR || — || align=right | 6.6 km || 
|-id=261 bgcolor=#E9E9E9
| 103261 ||  || — || January 3, 2000 || Socorro || LINEAR || — || align=right | 1.8 km || 
|-id=262 bgcolor=#E9E9E9
| 103262 ||  || — || January 3, 2000 || Socorro || LINEAR || — || align=right | 5.4 km || 
|-id=263 bgcolor=#d6d6d6
| 103263 ||  || — || January 3, 2000 || Socorro || LINEAR || EMA || align=right | 8.0 km || 
|-id=264 bgcolor=#E9E9E9
| 103264 ||  || — || January 3, 2000 || Socorro || LINEAR || — || align=right | 3.2 km || 
|-id=265 bgcolor=#fefefe
| 103265 ||  || — || January 3, 2000 || Socorro || LINEAR || — || align=right | 1.5 km || 
|-id=266 bgcolor=#d6d6d6
| 103266 ||  || — || January 3, 2000 || Socorro || LINEAR || — || align=right | 5.6 km || 
|-id=267 bgcolor=#E9E9E9
| 103267 ||  || — || January 3, 2000 || Socorro || LINEAR || MRX || align=right | 2.6 km || 
|-id=268 bgcolor=#E9E9E9
| 103268 ||  || — || January 3, 2000 || Socorro || LINEAR || — || align=right | 4.3 km || 
|-id=269 bgcolor=#fefefe
| 103269 ||  || — || January 3, 2000 || Socorro || LINEAR || — || align=right | 1.9 km || 
|-id=270 bgcolor=#E9E9E9
| 103270 ||  || — || January 3, 2000 || Socorro || LINEAR || GEF || align=right | 2.6 km || 
|-id=271 bgcolor=#fefefe
| 103271 ||  || — || January 3, 2000 || Socorro || LINEAR || V || align=right | 1.8 km || 
|-id=272 bgcolor=#E9E9E9
| 103272 ||  || — || January 3, 2000 || Socorro || LINEAR || — || align=right | 5.1 km || 
|-id=273 bgcolor=#fefefe
| 103273 ||  || — || January 3, 2000 || Socorro || LINEAR || NYS || align=right | 1.4 km || 
|-id=274 bgcolor=#d6d6d6
| 103274 ||  || — || January 3, 2000 || Socorro || LINEAR || — || align=right | 4.4 km || 
|-id=275 bgcolor=#E9E9E9
| 103275 ||  || — || January 3, 2000 || Socorro || LINEAR || — || align=right | 6.2 km || 
|-id=276 bgcolor=#FA8072
| 103276 ||  || — || January 5, 2000 || Socorro || LINEAR || — || align=right | 1.3 km || 
|-id=277 bgcolor=#d6d6d6
| 103277 ||  || — || January 3, 2000 || Socorro || LINEAR || BRA || align=right | 3.3 km || 
|-id=278 bgcolor=#fefefe
| 103278 ||  || — || January 3, 2000 || Socorro || LINEAR || — || align=right | 1.3 km || 
|-id=279 bgcolor=#E9E9E9
| 103279 ||  || — || January 3, 2000 || Socorro || LINEAR || — || align=right | 4.2 km || 
|-id=280 bgcolor=#E9E9E9
| 103280 ||  || — || January 3, 2000 || Socorro || LINEAR || — || align=right | 2.6 km || 
|-id=281 bgcolor=#fefefe
| 103281 ||  || — || January 3, 2000 || Socorro || LINEAR || — || align=right | 1.1 km || 
|-id=282 bgcolor=#E9E9E9
| 103282 ||  || — || January 3, 2000 || Socorro || LINEAR || MRX || align=right | 1.9 km || 
|-id=283 bgcolor=#E9E9E9
| 103283 ||  || — || January 3, 2000 || Socorro || LINEAR || — || align=right | 1.7 km || 
|-id=284 bgcolor=#fefefe
| 103284 ||  || — || January 3, 2000 || Socorro || LINEAR || NYS || align=right | 2.0 km || 
|-id=285 bgcolor=#E9E9E9
| 103285 ||  || — || January 3, 2000 || Socorro || LINEAR || — || align=right | 1.7 km || 
|-id=286 bgcolor=#E9E9E9
| 103286 ||  || — || January 3, 2000 || Socorro || LINEAR || ADE || align=right | 6.6 km || 
|-id=287 bgcolor=#fefefe
| 103287 ||  || — || January 3, 2000 || Socorro || LINEAR || — || align=right | 1.7 km || 
|-id=288 bgcolor=#E9E9E9
| 103288 ||  || — || January 3, 2000 || Socorro || LINEAR || — || align=right | 4.0 km || 
|-id=289 bgcolor=#E9E9E9
| 103289 ||  || — || January 2, 2000 || Gnosca || S. Sposetti || — || align=right | 3.6 km || 
|-id=290 bgcolor=#E9E9E9
| 103290 ||  || — || January 5, 2000 || Črni Vrh || Črni Vrh || — || align=right | 4.4 km || 
|-id=291 bgcolor=#E9E9E9
| 103291 ||  || — || January 5, 2000 || Kitt Peak || Spacewatch || — || align=right | 2.1 km || 
|-id=292 bgcolor=#fefefe
| 103292 ||  || — || January 5, 2000 || Kitt Peak || Spacewatch || — || align=right | 1.7 km || 
|-id=293 bgcolor=#E9E9E9
| 103293 ||  || — || January 3, 2000 || Socorro || LINEAR || — || align=right | 2.1 km || 
|-id=294 bgcolor=#E9E9E9
| 103294 ||  || — || January 3, 2000 || Socorro || LINEAR || MIT || align=right | 6.1 km || 
|-id=295 bgcolor=#fefefe
| 103295 ||  || — || January 3, 2000 || Socorro || LINEAR || — || align=right | 3.1 km || 
|-id=296 bgcolor=#E9E9E9
| 103296 ||  || — || January 4, 2000 || Socorro || LINEAR || — || align=right | 2.7 km || 
|-id=297 bgcolor=#E9E9E9
| 103297 ||  || — || January 4, 2000 || Socorro || LINEAR || — || align=right | 3.4 km || 
|-id=298 bgcolor=#E9E9E9
| 103298 ||  || — || January 4, 2000 || Socorro || LINEAR || MAR || align=right | 3.0 km || 
|-id=299 bgcolor=#fefefe
| 103299 ||  || — || January 4, 2000 || Socorro || LINEAR || — || align=right | 2.8 km || 
|-id=300 bgcolor=#E9E9E9
| 103300 ||  || — || January 4, 2000 || Socorro || LINEAR || — || align=right | 5.4 km || 
|}

103301–103400 

|-bgcolor=#fefefe
| 103301 ||  || — || January 5, 2000 || Socorro || LINEAR || H || align=right | 1.7 km || 
|-id=302 bgcolor=#E9E9E9
| 103302 ||  || — || January 5, 2000 || Višnjan Observatory || K. Korlević || — || align=right | 2.0 km || 
|-id=303 bgcolor=#E9E9E9
| 103303 ||  || — || January 6, 2000 || Višnjan Observatory || K. Korlević || — || align=right | 3.3 km || 
|-id=304 bgcolor=#E9E9E9
| 103304 ||  || — || January 4, 2000 || Socorro || LINEAR || — || align=right | 2.9 km || 
|-id=305 bgcolor=#E9E9E9
| 103305 ||  || — || January 4, 2000 || Socorro || LINEAR || MIS || align=right | 5.0 km || 
|-id=306 bgcolor=#E9E9E9
| 103306 ||  || — || January 4, 2000 || Socorro || LINEAR || — || align=right | 2.6 km || 
|-id=307 bgcolor=#E9E9E9
| 103307 ||  || — || January 4, 2000 || Socorro || LINEAR || RAF || align=right | 1.8 km || 
|-id=308 bgcolor=#fefefe
| 103308 ||  || — || January 4, 2000 || Socorro || LINEAR || — || align=right | 1.6 km || 
|-id=309 bgcolor=#fefefe
| 103309 ||  || — || January 4, 2000 || Socorro || LINEAR || FLO || align=right | 2.2 km || 
|-id=310 bgcolor=#fefefe
| 103310 ||  || — || January 4, 2000 || Socorro || LINEAR || — || align=right | 2.1 km || 
|-id=311 bgcolor=#fefefe
| 103311 ||  || — || January 4, 2000 || Socorro || LINEAR || V || align=right | 2.2 km || 
|-id=312 bgcolor=#E9E9E9
| 103312 ||  || — || January 4, 2000 || Socorro || LINEAR || — || align=right | 1.9 km || 
|-id=313 bgcolor=#E9E9E9
| 103313 ||  || — || January 4, 2000 || Socorro || LINEAR || — || align=right | 4.2 km || 
|-id=314 bgcolor=#E9E9E9
| 103314 ||  || — || January 4, 2000 || Socorro || LINEAR || — || align=right | 2.5 km || 
|-id=315 bgcolor=#E9E9E9
| 103315 ||  || — || January 4, 2000 || Socorro || LINEAR || EUN || align=right | 2.9 km || 
|-id=316 bgcolor=#fefefe
| 103316 ||  || — || January 4, 2000 || Socorro || LINEAR || — || align=right | 1.7 km || 
|-id=317 bgcolor=#d6d6d6
| 103317 ||  || — || January 4, 2000 || Socorro || LINEAR || — || align=right | 9.3 km || 
|-id=318 bgcolor=#d6d6d6
| 103318 ||  || — || January 4, 2000 || Socorro || LINEAR || — || align=right | 7.5 km || 
|-id=319 bgcolor=#fefefe
| 103319 ||  || — || January 4, 2000 || Socorro || LINEAR || NYS || align=right | 1.7 km || 
|-id=320 bgcolor=#E9E9E9
| 103320 ||  || — || January 4, 2000 || Socorro || LINEAR || — || align=right | 5.8 km || 
|-id=321 bgcolor=#E9E9E9
| 103321 ||  || — || January 4, 2000 || Socorro || LINEAR || — || align=right | 3.1 km || 
|-id=322 bgcolor=#E9E9E9
| 103322 ||  || — || January 4, 2000 || Socorro || LINEAR || GER || align=right | 3.3 km || 
|-id=323 bgcolor=#fefefe
| 103323 ||  || — || January 4, 2000 || Socorro || LINEAR || — || align=right | 2.1 km || 
|-id=324 bgcolor=#fefefe
| 103324 ||  || — || January 4, 2000 || Socorro || LINEAR || — || align=right | 2.4 km || 
|-id=325 bgcolor=#fefefe
| 103325 ||  || — || January 4, 2000 || Socorro || LINEAR || — || align=right | 1.3 km || 
|-id=326 bgcolor=#d6d6d6
| 103326 ||  || — || January 4, 2000 || Socorro || LINEAR || — || align=right | 6.1 km || 
|-id=327 bgcolor=#E9E9E9
| 103327 ||  || — || January 5, 2000 || Socorro || LINEAR || MIT || align=right | 3.8 km || 
|-id=328 bgcolor=#E9E9E9
| 103328 ||  || — || January 5, 2000 || Socorro || LINEAR || — || align=right | 3.6 km || 
|-id=329 bgcolor=#fefefe
| 103329 ||  || — || January 5, 2000 || Socorro || LINEAR || FLO || align=right | 1.4 km || 
|-id=330 bgcolor=#E9E9E9
| 103330 ||  || — || January 5, 2000 || Socorro || LINEAR || — || align=right | 2.9 km || 
|-id=331 bgcolor=#E9E9E9
| 103331 ||  || — || January 5, 2000 || Socorro || LINEAR || — || align=right | 2.2 km || 
|-id=332 bgcolor=#E9E9E9
| 103332 ||  || — || January 5, 2000 || Socorro || LINEAR || — || align=right | 1.8 km || 
|-id=333 bgcolor=#fefefe
| 103333 ||  || — || January 5, 2000 || Socorro || LINEAR || — || align=right | 1.8 km || 
|-id=334 bgcolor=#fefefe
| 103334 ||  || — || January 5, 2000 || Socorro || LINEAR || — || align=right | 1.6 km || 
|-id=335 bgcolor=#E9E9E9
| 103335 ||  || — || January 5, 2000 || Socorro || LINEAR || RAF || align=right | 2.5 km || 
|-id=336 bgcolor=#E9E9E9
| 103336 ||  || — || January 5, 2000 || Socorro || LINEAR || — || align=right | 2.2 km || 
|-id=337 bgcolor=#E9E9E9
| 103337 ||  || — || January 5, 2000 || Socorro || LINEAR || RAF || align=right | 2.5 km || 
|-id=338 bgcolor=#E9E9E9
| 103338 ||  || — || January 5, 2000 || Socorro || LINEAR || — || align=right | 2.5 km || 
|-id=339 bgcolor=#fefefe
| 103339 ||  || — || January 5, 2000 || Socorro || LINEAR || — || align=right | 4.0 km || 
|-id=340 bgcolor=#E9E9E9
| 103340 ||  || — || January 5, 2000 || Socorro || LINEAR || — || align=right | 3.8 km || 
|-id=341 bgcolor=#E9E9E9
| 103341 ||  || — || January 5, 2000 || Socorro || LINEAR || — || align=right | 4.4 km || 
|-id=342 bgcolor=#E9E9E9
| 103342 ||  || — || January 5, 2000 || Socorro || LINEAR || — || align=right | 1.7 km || 
|-id=343 bgcolor=#E9E9E9
| 103343 ||  || — || January 5, 2000 || Socorro || LINEAR || — || align=right | 3.4 km || 
|-id=344 bgcolor=#E9E9E9
| 103344 ||  || — || January 5, 2000 || Socorro || LINEAR || — || align=right | 3.4 km || 
|-id=345 bgcolor=#fefefe
| 103345 ||  || — || January 5, 2000 || Socorro || LINEAR || V || align=right | 1.8 km || 
|-id=346 bgcolor=#fefefe
| 103346 ||  || — || January 5, 2000 || Socorro || LINEAR || — || align=right | 1.5 km || 
|-id=347 bgcolor=#fefefe
| 103347 ||  || — || January 5, 2000 || Socorro || LINEAR || — || align=right | 1.8 km || 
|-id=348 bgcolor=#E9E9E9
| 103348 ||  || — || January 5, 2000 || Socorro || LINEAR || — || align=right | 4.9 km || 
|-id=349 bgcolor=#d6d6d6
| 103349 ||  || — || January 5, 2000 || Socorro || LINEAR || EOS || align=right | 4.1 km || 
|-id=350 bgcolor=#fefefe
| 103350 ||  || — || January 5, 2000 || Socorro || LINEAR || FLO || align=right | 2.9 km || 
|-id=351 bgcolor=#fefefe
| 103351 ||  || — || January 5, 2000 || Socorro || LINEAR || — || align=right | 2.0 km || 
|-id=352 bgcolor=#fefefe
| 103352 ||  || — || January 5, 2000 || Socorro || LINEAR || — || align=right | 1.5 km || 
|-id=353 bgcolor=#E9E9E9
| 103353 ||  || — || January 5, 2000 || Socorro || LINEAR || — || align=right | 4.0 km || 
|-id=354 bgcolor=#d6d6d6
| 103354 ||  || — || January 5, 2000 || Socorro || LINEAR || — || align=right | 7.8 km || 
|-id=355 bgcolor=#E9E9E9
| 103355 ||  || — || January 5, 2000 || Socorro || LINEAR || ADE || align=right | 4.1 km || 
|-id=356 bgcolor=#d6d6d6
| 103356 ||  || — || January 5, 2000 || Socorro || LINEAR || — || align=right | 3.5 km || 
|-id=357 bgcolor=#fefefe
| 103357 ||  || — || January 2, 2000 || Socorro || LINEAR || PHO || align=right | 3.7 km || 
|-id=358 bgcolor=#FA8072
| 103358 ||  || — || January 4, 2000 || Socorro || LINEAR || — || align=right | 2.0 km || 
|-id=359 bgcolor=#E9E9E9
| 103359 ||  || — || January 4, 2000 || Socorro || LINEAR || — || align=right | 2.6 km || 
|-id=360 bgcolor=#fefefe
| 103360 ||  || — || January 4, 2000 || Socorro || LINEAR || — || align=right | 1.6 km || 
|-id=361 bgcolor=#E9E9E9
| 103361 ||  || — || January 4, 2000 || Socorro || LINEAR || — || align=right | 6.3 km || 
|-id=362 bgcolor=#fefefe
| 103362 ||  || — || January 4, 2000 || Socorro || LINEAR || — || align=right | 1.7 km || 
|-id=363 bgcolor=#E9E9E9
| 103363 ||  || — || January 5, 2000 || Socorro || LINEAR || — || align=right | 2.8 km || 
|-id=364 bgcolor=#E9E9E9
| 103364 ||  || — || January 5, 2000 || Socorro || LINEAR || — || align=right | 3.8 km || 
|-id=365 bgcolor=#E9E9E9
| 103365 ||  || — || January 5, 2000 || Socorro || LINEAR || — || align=right | 2.8 km || 
|-id=366 bgcolor=#d6d6d6
| 103366 ||  || — || January 5, 2000 || Socorro || LINEAR || — || align=right | 6.0 km || 
|-id=367 bgcolor=#fefefe
| 103367 ||  || — || January 5, 2000 || Socorro || LINEAR || PHO || align=right | 2.2 km || 
|-id=368 bgcolor=#fefefe
| 103368 ||  || — || January 5, 2000 || Socorro || LINEAR || — || align=right | 1.4 km || 
|-id=369 bgcolor=#E9E9E9
| 103369 ||  || — || January 5, 2000 || Socorro || LINEAR || VIB || align=right | 3.4 km || 
|-id=370 bgcolor=#E9E9E9
| 103370 ||  || — || January 5, 2000 || Socorro || LINEAR || — || align=right | 3.3 km || 
|-id=371 bgcolor=#fefefe
| 103371 ||  || — || January 5, 2000 || Socorro || LINEAR || FLO || align=right | 1.4 km || 
|-id=372 bgcolor=#fefefe
| 103372 ||  || — || January 5, 2000 || Socorro || LINEAR || FLO || align=right | 2.4 km || 
|-id=373 bgcolor=#fefefe
| 103373 ||  || — || January 5, 2000 || Socorro || LINEAR || FLO || align=right | 2.3 km || 
|-id=374 bgcolor=#fefefe
| 103374 ||  || — || January 5, 2000 || Socorro || LINEAR || — || align=right | 1.6 km || 
|-id=375 bgcolor=#fefefe
| 103375 ||  || — || January 5, 2000 || Socorro || LINEAR || — || align=right | 1.4 km || 
|-id=376 bgcolor=#d6d6d6
| 103376 ||  || — || January 5, 2000 || Socorro || LINEAR || EMA || align=right | 7.3 km || 
|-id=377 bgcolor=#E9E9E9
| 103377 ||  || — || January 5, 2000 || Socorro || LINEAR || DOR || align=right | 4.4 km || 
|-id=378 bgcolor=#fefefe
| 103378 ||  || — || January 5, 2000 || Socorro || LINEAR || FLO || align=right | 1.4 km || 
|-id=379 bgcolor=#E9E9E9
| 103379 ||  || — || January 5, 2000 || Socorro || LINEAR || — || align=right | 5.6 km || 
|-id=380 bgcolor=#fefefe
| 103380 ||  || — || January 5, 2000 || Socorro || LINEAR || V || align=right | 1.6 km || 
|-id=381 bgcolor=#d6d6d6
| 103381 ||  || — || January 5, 2000 || Socorro || LINEAR || — || align=right | 4.3 km || 
|-id=382 bgcolor=#fefefe
| 103382 ||  || — || January 5, 2000 || Socorro || LINEAR || FLO || align=right | 1.9 km || 
|-id=383 bgcolor=#fefefe
| 103383 ||  || — || January 5, 2000 || Socorro || LINEAR || FLO || align=right | 1.8 km || 
|-id=384 bgcolor=#E9E9E9
| 103384 ||  || — || January 5, 2000 || Socorro || LINEAR || — || align=right | 3.4 km || 
|-id=385 bgcolor=#fefefe
| 103385 ||  || — || January 5, 2000 || Socorro || LINEAR || V || align=right | 1.4 km || 
|-id=386 bgcolor=#fefefe
| 103386 ||  || — || January 5, 2000 || Socorro || LINEAR || — || align=right | 2.4 km || 
|-id=387 bgcolor=#fefefe
| 103387 ||  || — || January 5, 2000 || Socorro || LINEAR || — || align=right | 4.4 km || 
|-id=388 bgcolor=#fefefe
| 103388 ||  || — || January 5, 2000 || Socorro || LINEAR || — || align=right | 2.1 km || 
|-id=389 bgcolor=#fefefe
| 103389 ||  || — || January 5, 2000 || Socorro || LINEAR || FLO || align=right | 1.2 km || 
|-id=390 bgcolor=#E9E9E9
| 103390 ||  || — || January 5, 2000 || Socorro || LINEAR || — || align=right | 3.8 km || 
|-id=391 bgcolor=#fefefe
| 103391 ||  || — || January 5, 2000 || Socorro || LINEAR || — || align=right | 1.7 km || 
|-id=392 bgcolor=#E9E9E9
| 103392 ||  || — || January 5, 2000 || Socorro || LINEAR || — || align=right | 4.5 km || 
|-id=393 bgcolor=#fefefe
| 103393 ||  || — || January 5, 2000 || Socorro || LINEAR || — || align=right | 2.0 km || 
|-id=394 bgcolor=#E9E9E9
| 103394 ||  || — || January 5, 2000 || Socorro || LINEAR || — || align=right | 4.8 km || 
|-id=395 bgcolor=#fefefe
| 103395 ||  || — || January 5, 2000 || Socorro || LINEAR || — || align=right | 2.3 km || 
|-id=396 bgcolor=#E9E9E9
| 103396 ||  || — || January 5, 2000 || Socorro || LINEAR || GEF || align=right | 2.8 km || 
|-id=397 bgcolor=#E9E9E9
| 103397 ||  || — || January 5, 2000 || Socorro || LINEAR || — || align=right | 4.0 km || 
|-id=398 bgcolor=#E9E9E9
| 103398 ||  || — || January 5, 2000 || Socorro || LINEAR || — || align=right | 4.1 km || 
|-id=399 bgcolor=#fefefe
| 103399 ||  || — || January 5, 2000 || Socorro || LINEAR || — || align=right | 1.9 km || 
|-id=400 bgcolor=#E9E9E9
| 103400 ||  || — || January 5, 2000 || Socorro || LINEAR || — || align=right | 4.6 km || 
|}

103401–103500 

|-bgcolor=#fefefe
| 103401 ||  || — || January 6, 2000 || Socorro || LINEAR || — || align=right | 1.5 km || 
|-id=402 bgcolor=#fefefe
| 103402 ||  || — || January 3, 2000 || Socorro || LINEAR || FLO || align=right | 1.2 km || 
|-id=403 bgcolor=#E9E9E9
| 103403 ||  || — || January 3, 2000 || Socorro || LINEAR || HEN || align=right | 1.8 km || 
|-id=404 bgcolor=#E9E9E9
| 103404 ||  || — || January 4, 2000 || Socorro || LINEAR || — || align=right | 3.8 km || 
|-id=405 bgcolor=#fefefe
| 103405 ||  || — || January 4, 2000 || Socorro || LINEAR || MASslow? || align=right | 1.5 km || 
|-id=406 bgcolor=#E9E9E9
| 103406 ||  || — || January 4, 2000 || Socorro || LINEAR || — || align=right | 2.9 km || 
|-id=407 bgcolor=#E9E9E9
| 103407 ||  || — || January 4, 2000 || Socorro || LINEAR || — || align=right | 1.7 km || 
|-id=408 bgcolor=#fefefe
| 103408 ||  || — || January 5, 2000 || Socorro || LINEAR || FLO || align=right | 1.5 km || 
|-id=409 bgcolor=#E9E9E9
| 103409 ||  || — || January 5, 2000 || Socorro || LINEAR || — || align=right | 2.9 km || 
|-id=410 bgcolor=#E9E9E9
| 103410 ||  || — || January 5, 2000 || Socorro || LINEAR || — || align=right | 3.5 km || 
|-id=411 bgcolor=#fefefe
| 103411 ||  || — || January 5, 2000 || Socorro || LINEAR || — || align=right | 1.8 km || 
|-id=412 bgcolor=#E9E9E9
| 103412 ||  || — || January 5, 2000 || Socorro || LINEAR || EUN || align=right | 3.2 km || 
|-id=413 bgcolor=#E9E9E9
| 103413 ||  || — || January 5, 2000 || Socorro || LINEAR || — || align=right | 4.4 km || 
|-id=414 bgcolor=#fefefe
| 103414 ||  || — || January 5, 2000 || Socorro || LINEAR || — || align=right | 3.9 km || 
|-id=415 bgcolor=#E9E9E9
| 103415 ||  || — || January 7, 2000 || Socorro || LINEAR || — || align=right | 3.9 km || 
|-id=416 bgcolor=#d6d6d6
| 103416 ||  || — || January 7, 2000 || Socorro || LINEAR || EUP || align=right | 8.2 km || 
|-id=417 bgcolor=#E9E9E9
| 103417 ||  || — || January 7, 2000 || Socorro || LINEAR || GEF || align=right | 2.7 km || 
|-id=418 bgcolor=#fefefe
| 103418 ||  || — || January 7, 2000 || Socorro || LINEAR || FLO || align=right | 1.3 km || 
|-id=419 bgcolor=#E9E9E9
| 103419 ||  || — || January 8, 2000 || Socorro || LINEAR || — || align=right | 3.0 km || 
|-id=420 bgcolor=#E9E9E9
| 103420 ||  || — || January 8, 2000 || Socorro || LINEAR || — || align=right | 2.3 km || 
|-id=421 bgcolor=#fefefe
| 103421 Laurmatt ||  ||  || January 6, 2000 || San Marcello || L. Tesi, G. Forti || — || align=right | 1.9 km || 
|-id=422 bgcolor=#fefefe
| 103422 Laurisirén ||  ||  || January 9, 2000 || Nyrolä || A. Oksanen, M. Moilanen || V || align=right | 1.4 km || 
|-id=423 bgcolor=#E9E9E9
| 103423 ||  || — || January 11, 2000 || Prescott || P. G. Comba || — || align=right | 4.8 km || 
|-id=424 bgcolor=#fefefe
| 103424 ||  || — || January 3, 2000 || Socorro || LINEAR || NYS || align=right | 1.6 km || 
|-id=425 bgcolor=#E9E9E9
| 103425 ||  || — || January 3, 2000 || Socorro || LINEAR || — || align=right | 3.1 km || 
|-id=426 bgcolor=#E9E9E9
| 103426 ||  || — || January 3, 2000 || Socorro || LINEAR || — || align=right | 2.1 km || 
|-id=427 bgcolor=#E9E9E9
| 103427 ||  || — || January 3, 2000 || Socorro || LINEAR || AEO || align=right | 2.9 km || 
|-id=428 bgcolor=#fefefe
| 103428 ||  || — || January 3, 2000 || Socorro || LINEAR || FLO || align=right | 1.3 km || 
|-id=429 bgcolor=#fefefe
| 103429 ||  || — || January 3, 2000 || Socorro || LINEAR || — || align=right | 1.6 km || 
|-id=430 bgcolor=#E9E9E9
| 103430 ||  || — || January 3, 2000 || Socorro || LINEAR || — || align=right | 3.2 km || 
|-id=431 bgcolor=#fefefe
| 103431 ||  || — || January 3, 2000 || Socorro || LINEAR || — || align=right | 2.0 km || 
|-id=432 bgcolor=#E9E9E9
| 103432 ||  || — || January 3, 2000 || Socorro || LINEAR || — || align=right | 4.2 km || 
|-id=433 bgcolor=#E9E9E9
| 103433 ||  || — || January 8, 2000 || Socorro || LINEAR || — || align=right | 2.8 km || 
|-id=434 bgcolor=#E9E9E9
| 103434 ||  || — || January 7, 2000 || Socorro || LINEAR || — || align=right | 1.7 km || 
|-id=435 bgcolor=#d6d6d6
| 103435 ||  || — || January 7, 2000 || Socorro || LINEAR || — || align=right | 4.0 km || 
|-id=436 bgcolor=#E9E9E9
| 103436 ||  || — || January 7, 2000 || Socorro || LINEAR || — || align=right | 3.2 km || 
|-id=437 bgcolor=#fefefe
| 103437 ||  || — || January 7, 2000 || Socorro || LINEAR || — || align=right | 1.9 km || 
|-id=438 bgcolor=#E9E9E9
| 103438 ||  || — || January 7, 2000 || Socorro || LINEAR || — || align=right | 3.4 km || 
|-id=439 bgcolor=#E9E9E9
| 103439 ||  || — || January 7, 2000 || Socorro || LINEAR || — || align=right | 3.2 km || 
|-id=440 bgcolor=#d6d6d6
| 103440 ||  || — || January 8, 2000 || Socorro || LINEAR || — || align=right | 3.5 km || 
|-id=441 bgcolor=#E9E9E9
| 103441 ||  || — || January 8, 2000 || Socorro || LINEAR || EUN || align=right | 2.2 km || 
|-id=442 bgcolor=#E9E9E9
| 103442 ||  || — || January 8, 2000 || Socorro || LINEAR || MAR || align=right | 2.8 km || 
|-id=443 bgcolor=#E9E9E9
| 103443 ||  || — || January 8, 2000 || Socorro || LINEAR || — || align=right | 3.1 km || 
|-id=444 bgcolor=#E9E9E9
| 103444 ||  || — || January 8, 2000 || Socorro || LINEAR || — || align=right | 2.1 km || 
|-id=445 bgcolor=#E9E9E9
| 103445 ||  || — || January 8, 2000 || Socorro || LINEAR || EUN || align=right | 2.3 km || 
|-id=446 bgcolor=#E9E9E9
| 103446 ||  || — || January 8, 2000 || Socorro || LINEAR || ADE || align=right | 5.7 km || 
|-id=447 bgcolor=#E9E9E9
| 103447 ||  || — || January 8, 2000 || Socorro || LINEAR || — || align=right | 4.2 km || 
|-id=448 bgcolor=#E9E9E9
| 103448 ||  || — || January 8, 2000 || Socorro || LINEAR || — || align=right | 3.0 km || 
|-id=449 bgcolor=#E9E9E9
| 103449 ||  || — || January 8, 2000 || Socorro || LINEAR || — || align=right | 4.3 km || 
|-id=450 bgcolor=#E9E9E9
| 103450 ||  || — || January 8, 2000 || Socorro || LINEAR || BRG || align=right | 3.6 km || 
|-id=451 bgcolor=#E9E9E9
| 103451 ||  || — || January 8, 2000 || Socorro || LINEAR || — || align=right | 4.1 km || 
|-id=452 bgcolor=#E9E9E9
| 103452 ||  || — || January 8, 2000 || Socorro || LINEAR || — || align=right | 3.3 km || 
|-id=453 bgcolor=#E9E9E9
| 103453 ||  || — || January 8, 2000 || Socorro || LINEAR || — || align=right | 4.8 km || 
|-id=454 bgcolor=#E9E9E9
| 103454 ||  || — || January 8, 2000 || Socorro || LINEAR || — || align=right | 3.0 km || 
|-id=455 bgcolor=#E9E9E9
| 103455 ||  || — || January 8, 2000 || Socorro || LINEAR || 526 || align=right | 4.3 km || 
|-id=456 bgcolor=#E9E9E9
| 103456 ||  || — || January 8, 2000 || Socorro || LINEAR || CLO || align=right | 6.1 km || 
|-id=457 bgcolor=#E9E9E9
| 103457 ||  || — || January 8, 2000 || Socorro || LINEAR || — || align=right | 1.9 km || 
|-id=458 bgcolor=#E9E9E9
| 103458 ||  || — || January 8, 2000 || Socorro || LINEAR || GEF || align=right | 2.6 km || 
|-id=459 bgcolor=#E9E9E9
| 103459 ||  || — || January 9, 2000 || Socorro || LINEAR || BAR || align=right | 3.6 km || 
|-id=460 bgcolor=#E9E9E9
| 103460 Dieterherrmann ||  ||  || January 11, 2000 || Drebach || G. Lehmann, J. Kandler || — || align=right | 2.0 km || 
|-id=461 bgcolor=#fefefe
| 103461 ||  || — || January 14, 2000 || Farpoint || Farpoint Obs. || — || align=right | 1.9 km || 
|-id=462 bgcolor=#E9E9E9
| 103462 ||  || — || January 3, 2000 || Kitt Peak || Spacewatch || HOF || align=right | 5.1 km || 
|-id=463 bgcolor=#d6d6d6
| 103463 ||  || — || January 3, 2000 || Kitt Peak || Spacewatch || — || align=right | 3.3 km || 
|-id=464 bgcolor=#E9E9E9
| 103464 ||  || — || January 3, 2000 || Kitt Peak || Spacewatch || — || align=right | 2.5 km || 
|-id=465 bgcolor=#fefefe
| 103465 ||  || — || January 4, 2000 || Kitt Peak || Spacewatch || NYS || align=right | 1.7 km || 
|-id=466 bgcolor=#E9E9E9
| 103466 ||  || — || January 4, 2000 || Kitt Peak || Spacewatch || — || align=right | 5.0 km || 
|-id=467 bgcolor=#fefefe
| 103467 ||  || — || January 4, 2000 || Kitt Peak || Spacewatch || — || align=right | 2.1 km || 
|-id=468 bgcolor=#fefefe
| 103468 ||  || — || January 5, 2000 || Kitt Peak || Spacewatch || MAS || align=right | 1.4 km || 
|-id=469 bgcolor=#E9E9E9
| 103469 ||  || — || January 5, 2000 || Kitt Peak || Spacewatch || — || align=right | 2.2 km || 
|-id=470 bgcolor=#fefefe
| 103470 ||  || — || January 5, 2000 || Kitt Peak || Spacewatch || — || align=right | 2.3 km || 
|-id=471 bgcolor=#d6d6d6
| 103471 ||  || — || January 5, 2000 || Kitt Peak || Spacewatch || — || align=right | 2.6 km || 
|-id=472 bgcolor=#fefefe
| 103472 ||  || — || January 5, 2000 || Kitt Peak || Spacewatch || NYS || align=right | 1.1 km || 
|-id=473 bgcolor=#fefefe
| 103473 ||  || — || January 6, 2000 || Kitt Peak || Spacewatch || NYS || align=right | 1.5 km || 
|-id=474 bgcolor=#E9E9E9
| 103474 ||  || — || January 6, 2000 || Kitt Peak || Spacewatch || — || align=right | 3.0 km || 
|-id=475 bgcolor=#fefefe
| 103475 ||  || — || January 7, 2000 || Kitt Peak || Spacewatch || — || align=right | 1.7 km || 
|-id=476 bgcolor=#d6d6d6
| 103476 ||  || — || January 7, 2000 || Kitt Peak || Spacewatch || — || align=right | 4.9 km || 
|-id=477 bgcolor=#E9E9E9
| 103477 ||  || — || January 8, 2000 || Kitt Peak || Spacewatch || GEF || align=right | 2.3 km || 
|-id=478 bgcolor=#E9E9E9
| 103478 ||  || — || January 8, 2000 || Kitt Peak || Spacewatch || PAD || align=right | 3.5 km || 
|-id=479 bgcolor=#E9E9E9
| 103479 ||  || — || January 9, 2000 || Kitt Peak || Spacewatch || — || align=right | 3.2 km || 
|-id=480 bgcolor=#d6d6d6
| 103480 ||  || — || January 9, 2000 || Kitt Peak || Spacewatch || THM || align=right | 3.8 km || 
|-id=481 bgcolor=#E9E9E9
| 103481 ||  || — || January 11, 2000 || Kitt Peak || Spacewatch || — || align=right | 2.1 km || 
|-id=482 bgcolor=#E9E9E9
| 103482 ||  || — || January 10, 2000 || Kitt Peak || Spacewatch || — || align=right | 3.4 km || 
|-id=483 bgcolor=#fefefe
| 103483 ||  || — || January 10, 2000 || Kitt Peak || Spacewatch || FLO || align=right | 1.6 km || 
|-id=484 bgcolor=#fefefe
| 103484 ||  || — || January 10, 2000 || Kitt Peak || Spacewatch || — || align=right | 1.5 km || 
|-id=485 bgcolor=#E9E9E9
| 103485 ||  || — || January 4, 2000 || Socorro || LINEAR || EUN || align=right | 6.8 km || 
|-id=486 bgcolor=#fefefe
| 103486 ||  || — || January 4, 2000 || Socorro || LINEAR || — || align=right | 1.5 km || 
|-id=487 bgcolor=#E9E9E9
| 103487 ||  || — || January 4, 2000 || Socorro || LINEAR || — || align=right | 3.1 km || 
|-id=488 bgcolor=#fefefe
| 103488 ||  || — || January 4, 2000 || Socorro || LINEAR || V || align=right | 1.1 km || 
|-id=489 bgcolor=#E9E9E9
| 103489 ||  || — || January 4, 2000 || Socorro || LINEAR || — || align=right | 2.9 km || 
|-id=490 bgcolor=#d6d6d6
| 103490 ||  || — || January 5, 2000 || Socorro || LINEAR || — || align=right | 3.9 km || 
|-id=491 bgcolor=#E9E9E9
| 103491 ||  || — || January 5, 2000 || Anderson Mesa || LONEOS || — || align=right | 5.7 km || 
|-id=492 bgcolor=#E9E9E9
| 103492 ||  || — || January 5, 2000 || Kitt Peak || Spacewatch || — || align=right | 2.8 km || 
|-id=493 bgcolor=#E9E9E9
| 103493 ||  || — || January 5, 2000 || Anderson Mesa || LONEOS || — || align=right | 6.3 km || 
|-id=494 bgcolor=#E9E9E9
| 103494 ||  || — || January 6, 2000 || Socorro || LINEAR || AST || align=right | 3.6 km || 
|-id=495 bgcolor=#fefefe
| 103495 ||  || — || January 6, 2000 || Socorro || LINEAR || — || align=right | 1.7 km || 
|-id=496 bgcolor=#E9E9E9
| 103496 ||  || — || January 6, 2000 || Socorro || LINEAR || POS || align=right | 6.7 km || 
|-id=497 bgcolor=#fefefe
| 103497 ||  || — || January 7, 2000 || Anderson Mesa || LONEOS || — || align=right | 3.0 km || 
|-id=498 bgcolor=#E9E9E9
| 103498 ||  || — || January 7, 2000 || Socorro || LINEAR || — || align=right | 2.6 km || 
|-id=499 bgcolor=#E9E9E9
| 103499 ||  || — || January 8, 2000 || Socorro || LINEAR || EUN || align=right | 2.4 km || 
|-id=500 bgcolor=#fefefe
| 103500 ||  || — || January 9, 2000 || Socorro || LINEAR || PHO || align=right | 2.3 km || 
|}

103501–103600 

|-bgcolor=#FA8072
| 103501 ||  || — || January 8, 2000 || Mauna Kea || D. J. Tholen, R. J. Whiteley || — || align=right | 2.7 km || 
|-id=502 bgcolor=#fefefe
| 103502 ||  || — || January 2, 2000 || Socorro || LINEAR || — || align=right | 1.8 km || 
|-id=503 bgcolor=#E9E9E9
| 103503 ||  || — || January 4, 2000 || Anderson Mesa || LONEOS || — || align=right | 3.7 km || 
|-id=504 bgcolor=#E9E9E9
| 103504 ||  || — || January 4, 2000 || Socorro || LINEAR || HEN || align=right | 1.9 km || 
|-id=505 bgcolor=#fefefe
| 103505 || 2000 BW || — || January 28, 2000 || Socorro || LINEAR || H || align=right | 1.7 km || 
|-id=506 bgcolor=#FA8072
| 103506 ||  || — || January 28, 2000 || Socorro || LINEAR || — || align=right | 2.1 km || 
|-id=507 bgcolor=#d6d6d6
| 103507 ||  || — || January 26, 2000 || Kitt Peak || Spacewatch || — || align=right | 5.7 km || 
|-id=508 bgcolor=#C2FFFF
| 103508 ||  || — || January 27, 2000 || Kitt Peak || Spacewatch || L4 || align=right | 15 km || 
|-id=509 bgcolor=#fefefe
| 103509 ||  || — || January 26, 2000 || Višnjan Observatory || K. Korlević || — || align=right | 1.9 km || 
|-id=510 bgcolor=#fefefe
| 103510 ||  || — || January 26, 2000 || Socorro || LINEAR || PHO || align=right | 2.8 km || 
|-id=511 bgcolor=#fefefe
| 103511 ||  || — || January 25, 2000 || Višnjan Observatory || K. Korlević || — || align=right | 1.6 km || 
|-id=512 bgcolor=#fefefe
| 103512 ||  || — || January 26, 2000 || Višnjan Observatory || K. Korlević || — || align=right | 2.1 km || 
|-id=513 bgcolor=#E9E9E9
| 103513 ||  || — || January 27, 2000 || Oizumi || T. Kobayashi || — || align=right | 4.7 km || 
|-id=514 bgcolor=#E9E9E9
| 103514 ||  || — || January 21, 2000 || Socorro || LINEAR || EUN || align=right | 5.3 km || 
|-id=515 bgcolor=#E9E9E9
| 103515 ||  || — || January 21, 2000 || Socorro || LINEAR || — || align=right | 3.0 km || 
|-id=516 bgcolor=#E9E9E9
| 103516 ||  || — || January 21, 2000 || Socorro || LINEAR || JUN || align=right | 3.2 km || 
|-id=517 bgcolor=#fefefe
| 103517 ||  || — || January 27, 2000 || Socorro || LINEAR || — || align=right | 1.7 km || 
|-id=518 bgcolor=#fefefe
| 103518 ||  || — || January 27, 2000 || Socorro || LINEAR || — || align=right | 1.1 km || 
|-id=519 bgcolor=#E9E9E9
| 103519 ||  || — || January 27, 2000 || Socorro || LINEAR || EUN || align=right | 2.4 km || 
|-id=520 bgcolor=#E9E9E9
| 103520 ||  || — || January 28, 2000 || Socorro || LINEAR || — || align=right | 5.6 km || 
|-id=521 bgcolor=#E9E9E9
| 103521 ||  || — || January 28, 2000 || Socorro || LINEAR || — || align=right | 2.8 km || 
|-id=522 bgcolor=#FA8072
| 103522 ||  || — || January 29, 2000 || Socorro || LINEAR || — || align=right | 1.4 km || 
|-id=523 bgcolor=#d6d6d6
| 103523 ||  || — || January 26, 2000 || Socorro || LINEAR || ALA || align=right | 6.9 km || 
|-id=524 bgcolor=#fefefe
| 103524 ||  || — || January 29, 2000 || Socorro || LINEAR || FLO || align=right | 1.5 km || 
|-id=525 bgcolor=#fefefe
| 103525 ||  || — || January 29, 2000 || Socorro || LINEAR || FLO || align=right | 1.5 km || 
|-id=526 bgcolor=#fefefe
| 103526 ||  || — || January 29, 2000 || Socorro || LINEAR || — || align=right | 1.7 km || 
|-id=527 bgcolor=#E9E9E9
| 103527 ||  || — || January 26, 2000 || Kitt Peak || Spacewatch || — || align=right | 2.0 km || 
|-id=528 bgcolor=#E9E9E9
| 103528 ||  || — || January 26, 2000 || Kitt Peak || Spacewatch || — || align=right | 1.6 km || 
|-id=529 bgcolor=#d6d6d6
| 103529 ||  || — || January 26, 2000 || Kitt Peak || Spacewatch || — || align=right | 3.4 km || 
|-id=530 bgcolor=#fefefe
| 103530 ||  || — || January 26, 2000 || Kitt Peak || Spacewatch || FLO || align=right | 1.1 km || 
|-id=531 bgcolor=#d6d6d6
| 103531 ||  || — || January 28, 2000 || Kitt Peak || Spacewatch || KOR || align=right | 2.1 km || 
|-id=532 bgcolor=#fefefe
| 103532 ||  || — || January 28, 2000 || Kitt Peak || Spacewatch || EUT || align=right | 1.5 km || 
|-id=533 bgcolor=#E9E9E9
| 103533 ||  || — || January 28, 2000 || Oizumi || T. Kobayashi || — || align=right | 7.1 km || 
|-id=534 bgcolor=#E9E9E9
| 103534 ||  || — || January 30, 2000 || Socorro || LINEAR || JUN || align=right | 4.6 km || 
|-id=535 bgcolor=#E9E9E9
| 103535 ||  || — || January 30, 2000 || Socorro || LINEAR || — || align=right | 2.7 km || 
|-id=536 bgcolor=#fefefe
| 103536 ||  || — || January 30, 2000 || Socorro || LINEAR || V || align=right | 1.5 km || 
|-id=537 bgcolor=#d6d6d6
| 103537 ||  || — || January 30, 2000 || Socorro || LINEAR || 3:2 || align=right | 11 km || 
|-id=538 bgcolor=#fefefe
| 103538 ||  || — || January 30, 2000 || Socorro || LINEAR || — || align=right | 4.9 km || 
|-id=539 bgcolor=#E9E9E9
| 103539 ||  || — || January 30, 2000 || Socorro || LINEAR || — || align=right | 3.0 km || 
|-id=540 bgcolor=#E9E9E9
| 103540 ||  || — || January 30, 2000 || Socorro || LINEAR || — || align=right | 5.0 km || 
|-id=541 bgcolor=#d6d6d6
| 103541 ||  || — || January 30, 2000 || Socorro || LINEAR || — || align=right | 5.2 km || 
|-id=542 bgcolor=#fefefe
| 103542 ||  || — || January 29, 2000 || Socorro || LINEAR || H || align=right | 1.0 km || 
|-id=543 bgcolor=#fefefe
| 103543 ||  || — || January 26, 2000 || Kitt Peak || Spacewatch || V || align=right | 1.3 km || 
|-id=544 bgcolor=#fefefe
| 103544 ||  || — || January 29, 2000 || Kitt Peak || Spacewatch || — || align=right | 1.2 km || 
|-id=545 bgcolor=#E9E9E9
| 103545 ||  || — || January 25, 2000 || Višnjan Observatory || K. Korlević || — || align=right | 1.8 km || 
|-id=546 bgcolor=#E9E9E9
| 103546 ||  || — || January 27, 2000 || Socorro || LINEAR || WAT || align=right | 4.0 km || 
|-id=547 bgcolor=#E9E9E9
| 103547 ||  || — || January 29, 2000 || Socorro || LINEAR || EUN || align=right | 2.8 km || 
|-id=548 bgcolor=#E9E9E9
| 103548 ||  || — || January 29, 2000 || Socorro || LINEAR || DOR || align=right | 5.2 km || 
|-id=549 bgcolor=#E9E9E9
| 103549 ||  || — || January 29, 2000 || Socorro || LINEAR || — || align=right | 4.4 km || 
|-id=550 bgcolor=#fefefe
| 103550 ||  || — || January 29, 2000 || Socorro || LINEAR || — || align=right | 2.4 km || 
|-id=551 bgcolor=#fefefe
| 103551 ||  || — || January 30, 2000 || Socorro || LINEAR || V || align=right | 1.6 km || 
|-id=552 bgcolor=#fefefe
| 103552 ||  || — || January 30, 2000 || Socorro || LINEAR || — || align=right | 2.2 km || 
|-id=553 bgcolor=#E9E9E9
| 103553 ||  || — || January 30, 2000 || Socorro || LINEAR || — || align=right | 3.2 km || 
|-id=554 bgcolor=#fefefe
| 103554 ||  || — || January 30, 2000 || Socorro || LINEAR || FLO || align=right | 1.8 km || 
|-id=555 bgcolor=#fefefe
| 103555 ||  || — || January 30, 2000 || Socorro || LINEAR || — || align=right | 4.3 km || 
|-id=556 bgcolor=#fefefe
| 103556 ||  || — || January 31, 2000 || Socorro || LINEAR || NYS || align=right | 1.4 km || 
|-id=557 bgcolor=#E9E9E9
| 103557 ||  || — || January 31, 2000 || Socorro || LINEAR || — || align=right | 2.9 km || 
|-id=558 bgcolor=#fefefe
| 103558 ||  || — || January 25, 2000 || Višnjan Observatory || K. Korlević || — || align=right | 2.4 km || 
|-id=559 bgcolor=#fefefe
| 103559 ||  || — || January 27, 2000 || Kitt Peak || Spacewatch || — || align=right | 2.1 km || 
|-id=560 bgcolor=#fefefe
| 103560 Peate ||  ||  || January 30, 2000 || Catalina || CSS || V || align=right | 1.7 km || 
|-id=561 bgcolor=#E9E9E9
| 103561 ||  || — || January 28, 2000 || Kitt Peak || Spacewatch || — || align=right | 4.5 km || 
|-id=562 bgcolor=#fefefe
| 103562 ||  || — || January 30, 2000 || Catalina || CSS || — || align=right | 1.9 km || 
|-id=563 bgcolor=#fefefe
| 103563 ||  || — || January 30, 2000 || Catalina || CSS || NYS || align=right | 1.2 km || 
|-id=564 bgcolor=#fefefe
| 103564 ||  || — || January 30, 2000 || Catalina || CSS || — || align=right | 2.5 km || 
|-id=565 bgcolor=#E9E9E9
| 103565 ||  || — || January 30, 2000 || Socorro || LINEAR || EUN || align=right | 2.4 km || 
|-id=566 bgcolor=#E9E9E9
| 103566 ||  || — || January 30, 2000 || Socorro || LINEAR || — || align=right | 3.7 km || 
|-id=567 bgcolor=#fefefe
| 103567 ||  || — || January 29, 2000 || Kitt Peak || Spacewatch || — || align=right | 1.3 km || 
|-id=568 bgcolor=#fefefe
| 103568 ||  || — || January 30, 2000 || Kitt Peak || Spacewatch || — || align=right | 1.5 km || 
|-id=569 bgcolor=#fefefe
| 103569 ||  || — || January 28, 2000 || Kitt Peak || Spacewatch || NYS || align=right | 1.3 km || 
|-id=570 bgcolor=#E9E9E9
| 103570 ||  || — || January 27, 2000 || Kitt Peak || Spacewatch || — || align=right | 3.2 km || 
|-id=571 bgcolor=#fefefe
| 103571 ||  || — || January 16, 2000 || Kitt Peak || Spacewatch || — || align=right | 1.3 km || 
|-id=572 bgcolor=#E9E9E9
| 103572 ||  || — || January 16, 2000 || Kitt Peak || Spacewatch || — || align=right | 2.2 km || 
|-id=573 bgcolor=#d6d6d6
| 103573 ||  || — || January 30, 2000 || Kitt Peak || Spacewatch || THM || align=right | 5.5 km || 
|-id=574 bgcolor=#E9E9E9
| 103574 || 2000 CR || — || February 3, 2000 || Prescott || P. G. Comba || — || align=right | 2.2 km || 
|-id=575 bgcolor=#fefefe
| 103575 || 2000 CS || — || February 3, 2000 || Prescott || P. G. Comba || — || align=right | 1.6 km || 
|-id=576 bgcolor=#fefefe
| 103576 ||  || — || February 4, 2000 || Zeno || T. Stafford || FLO || align=right | 2.1 km || 
|-id=577 bgcolor=#E9E9E9
| 103577 ||  || — || February 4, 2000 || Višnjan Observatory || K. Korlević || — || align=right | 3.1 km || 
|-id=578 bgcolor=#E9E9E9
| 103578 ||  || — || February 2, 2000 || Socorro || LINEAR || — || align=right | 2.7 km || 
|-id=579 bgcolor=#fefefe
| 103579 ||  || — || February 2, 2000 || Socorro || LINEAR || NYS || align=right | 4.3 km || 
|-id=580 bgcolor=#E9E9E9
| 103580 ||  || — || February 2, 2000 || Socorro || LINEAR || — || align=right | 2.2 km || 
|-id=581 bgcolor=#fefefe
| 103581 ||  || — || February 2, 2000 || Socorro || LINEAR || — || align=right | 1.8 km || 
|-id=582 bgcolor=#fefefe
| 103582 ||  || — || February 2, 2000 || Socorro || LINEAR || — || align=right | 1.8 km || 
|-id=583 bgcolor=#E9E9E9
| 103583 ||  || — || February 2, 2000 || Socorro || LINEAR || — || align=right | 5.1 km || 
|-id=584 bgcolor=#fefefe
| 103584 ||  || — || February 2, 2000 || Socorro || LINEAR || — || align=right | 4.0 km || 
|-id=585 bgcolor=#d6d6d6
| 103585 ||  || — || February 2, 2000 || Socorro || LINEAR || — || align=right | 5.6 km || 
|-id=586 bgcolor=#d6d6d6
| 103586 ||  || — || February 2, 2000 || Socorro || LINEAR || TEL || align=right | 2.6 km || 
|-id=587 bgcolor=#fefefe
| 103587 ||  || — || February 2, 2000 || Socorro || LINEAR || — || align=right | 1.4 km || 
|-id=588 bgcolor=#E9E9E9
| 103588 ||  || — || February 2, 2000 || Socorro || LINEAR || — || align=right | 3.5 km || 
|-id=589 bgcolor=#fefefe
| 103589 ||  || — || February 2, 2000 || Socorro || LINEAR || — || align=right | 1.8 km || 
|-id=590 bgcolor=#E9E9E9
| 103590 ||  || — || February 2, 2000 || Socorro || LINEAR || — || align=right | 1.9 km || 
|-id=591 bgcolor=#E9E9E9
| 103591 ||  || — || February 2, 2000 || Socorro || LINEAR || GEF || align=right | 2.2 km || 
|-id=592 bgcolor=#fefefe
| 103592 ||  || — || February 2, 2000 || Socorro || LINEAR || FLO || align=right | 1.9 km || 
|-id=593 bgcolor=#E9E9E9
| 103593 ||  || — || February 2, 2000 || Socorro || LINEAR || MIS || align=right | 5.1 km || 
|-id=594 bgcolor=#E9E9E9
| 103594 ||  || — || February 2, 2000 || Socorro || LINEAR || — || align=right | 4.7 km || 
|-id=595 bgcolor=#fefefe
| 103595 ||  || — || February 2, 2000 || Socorro || LINEAR || — || align=right | 2.1 km || 
|-id=596 bgcolor=#E9E9E9
| 103596 ||  || — || February 2, 2000 || Socorro || LINEAR || MAR || align=right | 3.1 km || 
|-id=597 bgcolor=#fefefe
| 103597 ||  || — || February 2, 2000 || Socorro || LINEAR || NYS || align=right | 1.2 km || 
|-id=598 bgcolor=#E9E9E9
| 103598 ||  || — || February 2, 2000 || Socorro || LINEAR || — || align=right | 2.8 km || 
|-id=599 bgcolor=#fefefe
| 103599 ||  || — || February 2, 2000 || Socorro || LINEAR || MAS || align=right | 1.5 km || 
|-id=600 bgcolor=#fefefe
| 103600 ||  || — || February 2, 2000 || Socorro || LINEAR || FLO || align=right | 2.6 km || 
|}

103601–103700 

|-bgcolor=#fefefe
| 103601 ||  || — || February 2, 2000 || Socorro || LINEAR || V || align=right | 1.3 km || 
|-id=602 bgcolor=#fefefe
| 103602 ||  || — || February 2, 2000 || Socorro || LINEAR || FLO || align=right | 1.1 km || 
|-id=603 bgcolor=#E9E9E9
| 103603 ||  || — || February 2, 2000 || Socorro || LINEAR || — || align=right | 2.5 km || 
|-id=604 bgcolor=#E9E9E9
| 103604 ||  || — || February 2, 2000 || Socorro || LINEAR || — || align=right | 3.0 km || 
|-id=605 bgcolor=#fefefe
| 103605 ||  || — || February 2, 2000 || Socorro || LINEAR || V || align=right | 1.5 km || 
|-id=606 bgcolor=#E9E9E9
| 103606 ||  || — || February 2, 2000 || Socorro || LINEAR || EUN || align=right | 2.5 km || 
|-id=607 bgcolor=#E9E9E9
| 103607 ||  || — || February 2, 2000 || Socorro || LINEAR || AEO || align=right | 1.6 km || 
|-id=608 bgcolor=#fefefe
| 103608 ||  || — || February 2, 2000 || Socorro || LINEAR || — || align=right | 1.7 km || 
|-id=609 bgcolor=#E9E9E9
| 103609 ||  || — || February 2, 2000 || Socorro || LINEAR || — || align=right | 1.9 km || 
|-id=610 bgcolor=#E9E9E9
| 103610 ||  || — || February 2, 2000 || Socorro || LINEAR || — || align=right | 2.1 km || 
|-id=611 bgcolor=#fefefe
| 103611 ||  || — || February 2, 2000 || Socorro || LINEAR || NYS || align=right | 1.7 km || 
|-id=612 bgcolor=#E9E9E9
| 103612 ||  || — || February 2, 2000 || Socorro || LINEAR || MAR || align=right | 2.2 km || 
|-id=613 bgcolor=#E9E9E9
| 103613 ||  || — || February 2, 2000 || Socorro || LINEAR || GEF || align=right | 2.4 km || 
|-id=614 bgcolor=#E9E9E9
| 103614 ||  || — || February 2, 2000 || Socorro || LINEAR || — || align=right | 2.8 km || 
|-id=615 bgcolor=#E9E9E9
| 103615 ||  || — || February 2, 2000 || Socorro || LINEAR || — || align=right | 4.7 km || 
|-id=616 bgcolor=#fefefe
| 103616 ||  || — || February 2, 2000 || Socorro || LINEAR || — || align=right | 1.6 km || 
|-id=617 bgcolor=#fefefe
| 103617 ||  || — || February 2, 2000 || Socorro || LINEAR || — || align=right | 4.1 km || 
|-id=618 bgcolor=#E9E9E9
| 103618 ||  || — || February 2, 2000 || Socorro || LINEAR || — || align=right | 3.0 km || 
|-id=619 bgcolor=#fefefe
| 103619 ||  || — || February 2, 2000 || Socorro || LINEAR || — || align=right | 2.0 km || 
|-id=620 bgcolor=#fefefe
| 103620 ||  || — || February 2, 2000 || Socorro || LINEAR || — || align=right | 1.5 km || 
|-id=621 bgcolor=#fefefe
| 103621 ||  || — || February 2, 2000 || Socorro || LINEAR || — || align=right | 2.0 km || 
|-id=622 bgcolor=#E9E9E9
| 103622 ||  || — || February 2, 2000 || Socorro || LINEAR || AEO || align=right | 1.7 km || 
|-id=623 bgcolor=#E9E9E9
| 103623 ||  || — || February 2, 2000 || Socorro || LINEAR || — || align=right | 5.0 km || 
|-id=624 bgcolor=#E9E9E9
| 103624 ||  || — || February 2, 2000 || Socorro || LINEAR || — || align=right | 4.7 km || 
|-id=625 bgcolor=#fefefe
| 103625 ||  || — || February 2, 2000 || Socorro || LINEAR || — || align=right | 1.8 km || 
|-id=626 bgcolor=#fefefe
| 103626 ||  || — || February 2, 2000 || Socorro || LINEAR || — || align=right | 1.6 km || 
|-id=627 bgcolor=#E9E9E9
| 103627 ||  || — || February 2, 2000 || Socorro || LINEAR || — || align=right | 4.3 km || 
|-id=628 bgcolor=#fefefe
| 103628 ||  || — || February 2, 2000 || Socorro || LINEAR || FLO || align=right | 1.5 km || 
|-id=629 bgcolor=#E9E9E9
| 103629 ||  || — || February 2, 2000 || Socorro || LINEAR || GEF || align=right | 2.8 km || 
|-id=630 bgcolor=#d6d6d6
| 103630 ||  || — || February 2, 2000 || Socorro || LINEAR || — || align=right | 4.5 km || 
|-id=631 bgcolor=#E9E9E9
| 103631 ||  || — || February 2, 2000 || Socorro || LINEAR || — || align=right | 3.2 km || 
|-id=632 bgcolor=#E9E9E9
| 103632 ||  || — || February 2, 2000 || Socorro || LINEAR || — || align=right | 1.9 km || 
|-id=633 bgcolor=#E9E9E9
| 103633 ||  || — || February 2, 2000 || Socorro || LINEAR || — || align=right | 3.5 km || 
|-id=634 bgcolor=#E9E9E9
| 103634 ||  || — || February 2, 2000 || Socorro || LINEAR || — || align=right | 3.4 km || 
|-id=635 bgcolor=#E9E9E9
| 103635 ||  || — || February 2, 2000 || Socorro || LINEAR || MRX || align=right | 2.1 km || 
|-id=636 bgcolor=#fefefe
| 103636 ||  || — || February 2, 2000 || Socorro || LINEAR || — || align=right | 1.5 km || 
|-id=637 bgcolor=#E9E9E9
| 103637 ||  || — || February 2, 2000 || Socorro || LINEAR || — || align=right | 4.8 km || 
|-id=638 bgcolor=#E9E9E9
| 103638 ||  || — || February 2, 2000 || Socorro || LINEAR || — || align=right | 5.6 km || 
|-id=639 bgcolor=#E9E9E9
| 103639 ||  || — || February 2, 2000 || Oaxaca || J. M. Roe || JUN || align=right | 2.9 km || 
|-id=640 bgcolor=#d6d6d6
| 103640 ||  || — || February 4, 2000 || Višnjan Observatory || K. Korlević || HYG || align=right | 5.5 km || 
|-id=641 bgcolor=#fefefe
| 103641 ||  || — || February 4, 2000 || Višnjan Observatory || K. Korlević || — || align=right | 2.2 km || 
|-id=642 bgcolor=#fefefe
| 103642 ||  || — || February 5, 2000 || Višnjan Observatory || K. Korlević || V || align=right | 1.3 km || 
|-id=643 bgcolor=#d6d6d6
| 103643 ||  || — || February 2, 2000 || Socorro || LINEAR || EOS || align=right | 7.6 km || 
|-id=644 bgcolor=#fefefe
| 103644 ||  || — || February 2, 2000 || Socorro || LINEAR || FLO || align=right | 2.0 km || 
|-id=645 bgcolor=#d6d6d6
| 103645 ||  || — || February 2, 2000 || Socorro || LINEAR || — || align=right | 6.6 km || 
|-id=646 bgcolor=#E9E9E9
| 103646 ||  || — || February 2, 2000 || Socorro || LINEAR || — || align=right | 4.3 km || 
|-id=647 bgcolor=#fefefe
| 103647 ||  || — || February 2, 2000 || Socorro || LINEAR || — || align=right | 1.9 km || 
|-id=648 bgcolor=#E9E9E9
| 103648 ||  || — || February 2, 2000 || Socorro || LINEAR || — || align=right | 3.4 km || 
|-id=649 bgcolor=#fefefe
| 103649 ||  || — || February 3, 2000 || Socorro || LINEAR || FLO || align=right | 1.8 km || 
|-id=650 bgcolor=#fefefe
| 103650 ||  || — || February 3, 2000 || Socorro || LINEAR || — || align=right | 1.4 km || 
|-id=651 bgcolor=#fefefe
| 103651 ||  || — || February 3, 2000 || Socorro || LINEAR || — || align=right | 1.6 km || 
|-id=652 bgcolor=#d6d6d6
| 103652 ||  || — || February 3, 2000 || Socorro || LINEAR || THM || align=right | 3.9 km || 
|-id=653 bgcolor=#fefefe
| 103653 ||  || — || February 5, 2000 || Višnjan Observatory || K. Korlević || — || align=right | 1.5 km || 
|-id=654 bgcolor=#fefefe
| 103654 ||  || — || February 2, 2000 || Catalina || CSS || NYS || align=right | 1.3 km || 
|-id=655 bgcolor=#fefefe
| 103655 ||  || — || February 6, 2000 || Prescott || P. G. Comba || V || align=right data-sort-value="0.94" | 940 m || 
|-id=656 bgcolor=#E9E9E9
| 103656 ||  || — || February 2, 2000 || Socorro || LINEAR || — || align=right | 2.9 km || 
|-id=657 bgcolor=#fefefe
| 103657 ||  || — || February 2, 2000 || Socorro || LINEAR || — || align=right | 1.9 km || 
|-id=658 bgcolor=#fefefe
| 103658 ||  || — || February 2, 2000 || Socorro || LINEAR || — || align=right | 1.6 km || 
|-id=659 bgcolor=#E9E9E9
| 103659 ||  || — || February 2, 2000 || Socorro || LINEAR || — || align=right | 2.8 km || 
|-id=660 bgcolor=#fefefe
| 103660 ||  || — || February 2, 2000 || Socorro || LINEAR || MAS || align=right | 1.5 km || 
|-id=661 bgcolor=#fefefe
| 103661 ||  || — || February 2, 2000 || Socorro || LINEAR || — || align=right | 1.6 km || 
|-id=662 bgcolor=#fefefe
| 103662 ||  || — || February 2, 2000 || Socorro || LINEAR || V || align=right | 1.2 km || 
|-id=663 bgcolor=#E9E9E9
| 103663 ||  || — || February 2, 2000 || Socorro || LINEAR || GEF || align=right | 5.0 km || 
|-id=664 bgcolor=#E9E9E9
| 103664 ||  || — || February 2, 2000 || Socorro || LINEAR || DOR || align=right | 5.1 km || 
|-id=665 bgcolor=#d6d6d6
| 103665 ||  || — || February 2, 2000 || Socorro || LINEAR || — || align=right | 3.4 km || 
|-id=666 bgcolor=#E9E9E9
| 103666 ||  || — || February 2, 2000 || Socorro || LINEAR || — || align=right | 5.4 km || 
|-id=667 bgcolor=#E9E9E9
| 103667 ||  || — || February 2, 2000 || Socorro || LINEAR || — || align=right | 5.4 km || 
|-id=668 bgcolor=#d6d6d6
| 103668 ||  || — || February 2, 2000 || Socorro || LINEAR || — || align=right | 6.8 km || 
|-id=669 bgcolor=#fefefe
| 103669 ||  || — || February 2, 2000 || Socorro || LINEAR || — || align=right | 1.7 km || 
|-id=670 bgcolor=#d6d6d6
| 103670 ||  || — || February 2, 2000 || Socorro || LINEAR || THM || align=right | 5.4 km || 
|-id=671 bgcolor=#E9E9E9
| 103671 ||  || — || February 2, 2000 || Socorro || LINEAR || MIS || align=right | 6.1 km || 
|-id=672 bgcolor=#E9E9E9
| 103672 ||  || — || February 3, 2000 || Socorro || LINEAR || — || align=right | 3.2 km || 
|-id=673 bgcolor=#E9E9E9
| 103673 ||  || — || February 4, 2000 || Socorro || LINEAR || — || align=right | 5.5 km || 
|-id=674 bgcolor=#fefefe
| 103674 ||  || — || February 2, 2000 || Socorro || LINEAR || H || align=right | 1.5 km || 
|-id=675 bgcolor=#fefefe
| 103675 ||  || — || February 2, 2000 || Socorro || LINEAR || — || align=right | 1.6 km || 
|-id=676 bgcolor=#E9E9E9
| 103676 ||  || — || February 2, 2000 || Socorro || LINEAR || — || align=right | 2.2 km || 
|-id=677 bgcolor=#d6d6d6
| 103677 ||  || — || February 2, 2000 || Socorro || LINEAR || — || align=right | 6.1 km || 
|-id=678 bgcolor=#E9E9E9
| 103678 ||  || — || February 2, 2000 || Socorro || LINEAR || — || align=right | 5.3 km || 
|-id=679 bgcolor=#E9E9E9
| 103679 ||  || — || February 2, 2000 || Socorro || LINEAR || CLO || align=right | 5.1 km || 
|-id=680 bgcolor=#E9E9E9
| 103680 ||  || — || February 2, 2000 || Socorro || LINEAR || — || align=right | 3.3 km || 
|-id=681 bgcolor=#E9E9E9
| 103681 ||  || — || February 2, 2000 || Socorro || LINEAR || — || align=right | 5.2 km || 
|-id=682 bgcolor=#E9E9E9
| 103682 ||  || — || February 2, 2000 || Socorro || LINEAR || — || align=right | 2.9 km || 
|-id=683 bgcolor=#d6d6d6
| 103683 ||  || — || February 3, 2000 || Socorro || LINEAR || — || align=right | 3.9 km || 
|-id=684 bgcolor=#fefefe
| 103684 ||  || — || February 3, 2000 || Socorro || LINEAR || — || align=right | 1.6 km || 
|-id=685 bgcolor=#E9E9E9
| 103685 ||  || — || February 6, 2000 || Socorro || LINEAR || MRX || align=right | 2.5 km || 
|-id=686 bgcolor=#fefefe
| 103686 ||  || — || February 6, 2000 || Socorro || LINEAR || FLO || align=right | 1.1 km || 
|-id=687 bgcolor=#E9E9E9
| 103687 ||  || — || February 1, 2000 || Kitt Peak || Spacewatch || — || align=right | 3.2 km || 
|-id=688 bgcolor=#fefefe
| 103688 ||  || — || February 1, 2000 || Kitt Peak || Spacewatch || MAS || align=right | 1.4 km || 
|-id=689 bgcolor=#E9E9E9
| 103689 ||  || — || February 1, 2000 || Kitt Peak || Spacewatch || MAR || align=right | 2.4 km || 
|-id=690 bgcolor=#fefefe
| 103690 ||  || — || February 7, 2000 || Socorro || LINEAR || NYS || align=right | 1.8 km || 
|-id=691 bgcolor=#d6d6d6
| 103691 ||  || — || February 7, 2000 || Kitt Peak || Spacewatch || KOR || align=right | 1.9 km || 
|-id=692 bgcolor=#E9E9E9
| 103692 ||  || — || February 3, 2000 || Višnjan Observatory || K. Korlević || — || align=right | 3.3 km || 
|-id=693 bgcolor=#E9E9E9
| 103693 ||  || — || February 2, 2000 || Socorro || LINEAR || — || align=right | 3.3 km || 
|-id=694 bgcolor=#E9E9E9
| 103694 ||  || — || February 7, 2000 || Kitt Peak || Spacewatch || — || align=right | 2.3 km || 
|-id=695 bgcolor=#fefefe
| 103695 ||  || — || February 5, 2000 || Socorro || LINEAR || — || align=right | 2.8 km || 
|-id=696 bgcolor=#E9E9E9
| 103696 ||  || — || February 6, 2000 || Socorro || LINEAR || INO || align=right | 1.8 km || 
|-id=697 bgcolor=#fefefe
| 103697 ||  || — || February 8, 2000 || Socorro || LINEAR || V || align=right | 1.7 km || 
|-id=698 bgcolor=#E9E9E9
| 103698 ||  || — || February 10, 2000 || Višnjan Observatory || K. Korlević || — || align=right | 6.5 km || 
|-id=699 bgcolor=#fefefe
| 103699 ||  || — || February 7, 2000 || Kitt Peak || Spacewatch || — || align=right | 1.0 km || 
|-id=700 bgcolor=#E9E9E9
| 103700 ||  || — || February 7, 2000 || Kitt Peak || Spacewatch || PAD || align=right | 4.1 km || 
|}

103701–103800 

|-bgcolor=#fefefe
| 103701 ||  || — || February 7, 2000 || Kitt Peak || Spacewatch || V || align=right | 1.3 km || 
|-id=702 bgcolor=#E9E9E9
| 103702 ||  || — || February 8, 2000 || Kitt Peak || Spacewatch || — || align=right | 3.9 km || 
|-id=703 bgcolor=#fefefe
| 103703 ||  || — || February 4, 2000 || Socorro || LINEAR || — || align=right | 2.1 km || 
|-id=704 bgcolor=#fefefe
| 103704 ||  || — || February 4, 2000 || Socorro || LINEAR || — || align=right | 2.0 km || 
|-id=705 bgcolor=#fefefe
| 103705 ||  || — || February 4, 2000 || Socorro || LINEAR || — || align=right | 2.5 km || 
|-id=706 bgcolor=#E9E9E9
| 103706 ||  || — || February 4, 2000 || Socorro || LINEAR || — || align=right | 3.1 km || 
|-id=707 bgcolor=#d6d6d6
| 103707 ||  || — || February 4, 2000 || Socorro || LINEAR || THM || align=right | 7.0 km || 
|-id=708 bgcolor=#E9E9E9
| 103708 ||  || — || February 4, 2000 || Socorro || LINEAR || — || align=right | 4.8 km || 
|-id=709 bgcolor=#fefefe
| 103709 ||  || — || February 4, 2000 || Socorro || LINEAR || FLO || align=right | 1.5 km || 
|-id=710 bgcolor=#fefefe
| 103710 ||  || — || February 4, 2000 || Socorro || LINEAR || V || align=right | 1.9 km || 
|-id=711 bgcolor=#E9E9E9
| 103711 ||  || — || February 4, 2000 || Socorro || LINEAR || — || align=right | 3.7 km || 
|-id=712 bgcolor=#E9E9E9
| 103712 ||  || — || February 4, 2000 || Socorro || LINEAR || — || align=right | 5.3 km || 
|-id=713 bgcolor=#fefefe
| 103713 ||  || — || February 4, 2000 || Socorro || LINEAR || MAS || align=right | 1.7 km || 
|-id=714 bgcolor=#fefefe
| 103714 ||  || — || February 4, 2000 || Socorro || LINEAR || NYS || align=right | 1.5 km || 
|-id=715 bgcolor=#E9E9E9
| 103715 ||  || — || February 6, 2000 || Socorro || LINEAR || — || align=right | 4.2 km || 
|-id=716 bgcolor=#fefefe
| 103716 ||  || — || February 6, 2000 || Socorro || LINEAR || — || align=right | 2.7 km || 
|-id=717 bgcolor=#fefefe
| 103717 ||  || — || February 6, 2000 || Socorro || LINEAR || KLI || align=right | 5.3 km || 
|-id=718 bgcolor=#fefefe
| 103718 ||  || — || February 6, 2000 || Socorro || LINEAR || — || align=right | 2.5 km || 
|-id=719 bgcolor=#E9E9E9
| 103719 ||  || — || February 8, 2000 || Socorro || LINEAR || — || align=right | 4.1 km || 
|-id=720 bgcolor=#fefefe
| 103720 ||  || — || February 8, 2000 || Socorro || LINEAR || — || align=right | 3.7 km || 
|-id=721 bgcolor=#fefefe
| 103721 ||  || — || February 10, 2000 || Kitt Peak || Spacewatch || — || align=right | 1.5 km || 
|-id=722 bgcolor=#fefefe
| 103722 ||  || — || February 11, 2000 || Kitt Peak || Spacewatch || — || align=right | 1.6 km || 
|-id=723 bgcolor=#fefefe
| 103723 ||  || — || February 11, 2000 || Kitt Peak || Spacewatch || NYS || align=right | 1.1 km || 
|-id=724 bgcolor=#fefefe
| 103724 ||  || — || February 6, 2000 || Socorro || LINEAR || V || align=right | 1.7 km || 
|-id=725 bgcolor=#d6d6d6
| 103725 ||  || — || February 7, 2000 || Kitt Peak || Spacewatch || — || align=right | 4.2 km || 
|-id=726 bgcolor=#d6d6d6
| 103726 ||  || — || February 8, 2000 || Kitt Peak || Spacewatch || — || align=right | 3.4 km || 
|-id=727 bgcolor=#d6d6d6
| 103727 ||  || — || February 8, 2000 || Kitt Peak || Spacewatch || — || align=right | 3.7 km || 
|-id=728 bgcolor=#d6d6d6
| 103728 ||  || — || February 10, 2000 || Kitt Peak || Spacewatch || KOR || align=right | 2.4 km || 
|-id=729 bgcolor=#fefefe
| 103729 ||  || — || February 12, 2000 || Kitt Peak || Spacewatch || V || align=right | 1.4 km || 
|-id=730 bgcolor=#fefefe
| 103730 ||  || — || February 2, 2000 || Socorro || LINEAR || NYS || align=right | 1.7 km || 
|-id=731 bgcolor=#fefefe
| 103731 ||  || — || February 2, 2000 || Socorro || LINEAR || NYS || align=right | 1.2 km || 
|-id=732 bgcolor=#FA8072
| 103732 ||  || — || February 8, 2000 || Socorro || LINEAR || PHO || align=right | 2.7 km || 
|-id=733 bgcolor=#fefefe
| 103733 Bernardharris ||  ||  || February 5, 2000 || Kitt Peak || M. W. Buie || V || align=right data-sort-value="0.96" | 960 m || 
|-id=734 bgcolor=#fefefe
| 103734 Winstonscott ||  ||  || February 5, 2000 || Kitt Peak || M. W. Buie || — || align=right | 1.9 km || 
|-id=735 bgcolor=#E9E9E9
| 103735 ||  || — || February 5, 2000 || Catalina || CSS || — || align=right | 3.3 km || 
|-id=736 bgcolor=#E9E9E9
| 103736 ||  || — || February 5, 2000 || Catalina || CSS || — || align=right | 2.2 km || 
|-id=737 bgcolor=#E9E9E9
| 103737 Curbeam ||  ||  || February 5, 2000 || Kitt Peak || M. W. Buie || — || align=right | 3.4 km || 
|-id=738 bgcolor=#E9E9E9
| 103738 Stephaniewilson ||  ||  || February 5, 2000 || Kitt Peak || M. W. Buie || — || align=right | 3.1 km || 
|-id=739 bgcolor=#E9E9E9
| 103739 Higginbotham ||  ||  || February 6, 2000 || Kitt Peak || M. W. Buie || — || align=right | 5.0 km || 
|-id=740 bgcolor=#E9E9E9
| 103740 Budinger ||  ||  || February 6, 2000 || Kitt Peak || R. Millis || AST || align=right | 4.9 km || 
|-id=741 bgcolor=#E9E9E9
| 103741 ||  || — || February 7, 2000 || Catalina || CSS || MIT || align=right | 4.4 km || 
|-id=742 bgcolor=#fefefe
| 103742 ||  || — || February 7, 2000 || Catalina || CSS || — || align=right | 1.2 km || 
|-id=743 bgcolor=#E9E9E9
| 103743 ||  || — || February 7, 2000 || Catalina || CSS || — || align=right | 5.2 km || 
|-id=744 bgcolor=#fefefe
| 103744 ||  || — || February 7, 2000 || Catalina || CSS || V || align=right | 1.7 km || 
|-id=745 bgcolor=#E9E9E9
| 103745 ||  || — || February 8, 2000 || Kitt Peak || Spacewatch || — || align=right | 2.6 km || 
|-id=746 bgcolor=#fefefe
| 103746 ||  || — || February 10, 2000 || Kitt Peak || Spacewatch || V || align=right | 1.6 km || 
|-id=747 bgcolor=#E9E9E9
| 103747 ||  || — || February 1, 2000 || Catalina || CSS || — || align=right | 3.1 km || 
|-id=748 bgcolor=#fefefe
| 103748 ||  || — || February 2, 2000 || Socorro || LINEAR || — || align=right | 1.6 km || 
|-id=749 bgcolor=#E9E9E9
| 103749 ||  || — || February 3, 2000 || Socorro || LINEAR || — || align=right | 1.5 km || 
|-id=750 bgcolor=#fefefe
| 103750 ||  || — || February 3, 2000 || Socorro || LINEAR || — || align=right | 4.9 km || 
|-id=751 bgcolor=#fefefe
| 103751 ||  || — || February 2, 2000 || Socorro || LINEAR || MAS || align=right | 1.5 km || 
|-id=752 bgcolor=#E9E9E9
| 103752 ||  || — || February 3, 2000 || Socorro || LINEAR || — || align=right | 2.1 km || 
|-id=753 bgcolor=#E9E9E9
| 103753 ||  || — || February 3, 2000 || Socorro || LINEAR || — || align=right | 4.4 km || 
|-id=754 bgcolor=#d6d6d6
| 103754 ||  || — || February 3, 2000 || Socorro || LINEAR || — || align=right | 5.0 km || 
|-id=755 bgcolor=#fefefe
| 103755 ||  || — || February 3, 2000 || Socorro || LINEAR || FLO || align=right | 1.7 km || 
|-id=756 bgcolor=#E9E9E9
| 103756 ||  || — || February 3, 2000 || Socorro || LINEAR || — || align=right | 5.2 km || 
|-id=757 bgcolor=#E9E9E9
| 103757 ||  || — || February 3, 2000 || Socorro || LINEAR || — || align=right | 7.7 km || 
|-id=758 bgcolor=#fefefe
| 103758 ||  || — || February 3, 2000 || Socorro || LINEAR || NYS || align=right | 1.5 km || 
|-id=759 bgcolor=#fefefe
| 103759 ||  || — || February 3, 2000 || Socorro || LINEAR || — || align=right | 1.7 km || 
|-id=760 bgcolor=#E9E9E9
| 103760 ||  || — || February 3, 2000 || Socorro || LINEAR || — || align=right | 2.2 km || 
|-id=761 bgcolor=#fefefe
| 103761 ||  || — || February 3, 2000 || Kitt Peak || Spacewatch || — || align=right | 1.3 km || 
|-id=762 bgcolor=#d6d6d6
| 103762 ||  || — || February 3, 2000 || Kitt Peak || Spacewatch || — || align=right | 2.9 km || 
|-id=763 bgcolor=#E9E9E9
| 103763 ||  || — || February 3, 2000 || Kitt Peak || Spacewatch || — || align=right | 1.7 km || 
|-id=764 bgcolor=#d6d6d6
| 103764 ||  || — || February 4, 2000 || Kitt Peak || Spacewatch || KOR || align=right | 2.4 km || 
|-id=765 bgcolor=#d6d6d6
| 103765 ||  || — || February 4, 2000 || Kitt Peak || Spacewatch || — || align=right | 2.9 km || 
|-id=766 bgcolor=#E9E9E9
| 103766 ||  || — || February 3, 2000 || Socorro || LINEAR || AGN || align=right | 2.2 km || 
|-id=767 bgcolor=#d6d6d6
| 103767 ||  || — || February 2, 2000 || Kitt Peak || Spacewatch || CHA || align=right | 2.8 km || 
|-id=768 bgcolor=#E9E9E9
| 103768 || 2000 DO || — || February 23, 2000 || Višnjan Observatory || K. Korlević || DOR || align=right | 4.0 km || 
|-id=769 bgcolor=#fefefe
| 103769 || 2000 DV || — || February 24, 2000 || Oizumi || T. Kobayashi || — || align=right | 2.0 km || 
|-id=770 bgcolor=#d6d6d6
| 103770 Wilfriedlang ||  ||  || February 26, 2000 || Drebach || J. Kandler, G. Lehmann || — || align=right | 5.0 km || 
|-id=771 bgcolor=#d6d6d6
| 103771 ||  || — || February 26, 2000 || Kitt Peak || Spacewatch || — || align=right | 4.2 km || 
|-id=772 bgcolor=#fefefe
| 103772 ||  || — || February 26, 2000 || Kitt Peak || Spacewatch || FLO || align=right | 2.5 km || 
|-id=773 bgcolor=#fefefe
| 103773 ||  || — || February 26, 2000 || Kitt Peak || Spacewatch || — || align=right | 1.2 km || 
|-id=774 bgcolor=#E9E9E9
| 103774 ||  || — || February 28, 2000 || Socorro || LINEAR || — || align=right | 5.3 km || 
|-id=775 bgcolor=#d6d6d6
| 103775 ||  || — || February 28, 2000 || Socorro || LINEAR || — || align=right | 3.9 km || 
|-id=776 bgcolor=#E9E9E9
| 103776 ||  || — || February 28, 2000 || Socorro || LINEAR || — || align=right | 3.5 km || 
|-id=777 bgcolor=#E9E9E9
| 103777 ||  || — || February 28, 2000 || Socorro || LINEAR || — || align=right | 5.6 km || 
|-id=778 bgcolor=#fefefe
| 103778 ||  || — || February 28, 2000 || Socorro || LINEAR || FLO || align=right | 1.3 km || 
|-id=779 bgcolor=#E9E9E9
| 103779 ||  || — || February 24, 2000 || Socorro || LINEAR || PAL || align=right | 3.9 km || 
|-id=780 bgcolor=#fefefe
| 103780 ||  || — || February 25, 2000 || Socorro || LINEAR || NYS || align=right | 3.2 km || 
|-id=781 bgcolor=#fefefe
| 103781 ||  || — || February 29, 2000 || Oaxaca || J. M. Roe || — || align=right | 1.5 km || 
|-id=782 bgcolor=#fefefe
| 103782 ||  || — || February 29, 2000 || Oizumi || T. Kobayashi || — || align=right | 1.7 km || 
|-id=783 bgcolor=#fefefe
| 103783 ||  || — || February 28, 2000 || Kitt Peak || Spacewatch || NYS || align=right | 1.5 km || 
|-id=784 bgcolor=#d6d6d6
| 103784 ||  || — || February 28, 2000 || Kitt Peak || Spacewatch || KOR || align=right | 2.5 km || 
|-id=785 bgcolor=#fefefe
| 103785 ||  || — || February 27, 2000 || Rock Finder || W. K. Y. Yeung || MAS || align=right | 1.4 km || 
|-id=786 bgcolor=#fefefe
| 103786 ||  || — || February 26, 2000 || Kitt Peak || Spacewatch || NYS || align=right | 1.3 km || 
|-id=787 bgcolor=#fefefe
| 103787 ||  || — || February 26, 2000 || Kitt Peak || Spacewatch || NYS || align=right | 1.2 km || 
|-id=788 bgcolor=#d6d6d6
| 103788 ||  || — || February 26, 2000 || Kitt Peak || Spacewatch || — || align=right | 4.6 km || 
|-id=789 bgcolor=#E9E9E9
| 103789 ||  || — || February 26, 2000 || Kitt Peak || Spacewatch || — || align=right | 3.1 km || 
|-id=790 bgcolor=#fefefe
| 103790 ||  || — || February 26, 2000 || Kitt Peak || Spacewatch || V || align=right | 1.2 km || 
|-id=791 bgcolor=#E9E9E9
| 103791 ||  || — || February 26, 2000 || Kitt Peak || Spacewatch || — || align=right | 3.9 km || 
|-id=792 bgcolor=#E9E9E9
| 103792 ||  || — || February 26, 2000 || Kitt Peak || Spacewatch || — || align=right | 1.6 km || 
|-id=793 bgcolor=#d6d6d6
| 103793 ||  || — || February 27, 2000 || Kitt Peak || Spacewatch || — || align=right | 4.4 km || 
|-id=794 bgcolor=#E9E9E9
| 103794 ||  || — || February 27, 2000 || Kitt Peak || Spacewatch || — || align=right | 2.7 km || 
|-id=795 bgcolor=#E9E9E9
| 103795 ||  || — || February 27, 2000 || Kitt Peak || Spacewatch || — || align=right | 3.1 km || 
|-id=796 bgcolor=#E9E9E9
| 103796 ||  || — || February 27, 2000 || Kitt Peak || Spacewatch || HEN || align=right | 1.9 km || 
|-id=797 bgcolor=#d6d6d6
| 103797 ||  || — || February 27, 2000 || Kitt Peak || Spacewatch || — || align=right | 3.3 km || 
|-id=798 bgcolor=#fefefe
| 103798 ||  || — || February 28, 2000 || Kitt Peak || Spacewatch || V || align=right | 1.1 km || 
|-id=799 bgcolor=#fefefe
| 103799 ||  || — || February 28, 2000 || Kitt Peak || Spacewatch || NYS || align=right | 1.2 km || 
|-id=800 bgcolor=#fefefe
| 103800 ||  || — || February 28, 2000 || Kitt Peak || Spacewatch || — || align=right | 1.3 km || 
|}

103801–103900 

|-bgcolor=#E9E9E9
| 103801 ||  || — || February 28, 2000 || Kitt Peak || Spacewatch || HEN || align=right | 3.2 km || 
|-id=802 bgcolor=#d6d6d6
| 103802 ||  || — || February 28, 2000 || Kitt Peak || Spacewatch || THM || align=right | 3.8 km || 
|-id=803 bgcolor=#fefefe
| 103803 ||  || — || February 29, 2000 || Socorro || LINEAR || H || align=right | 1.3 km || 
|-id=804 bgcolor=#d6d6d6
| 103804 ||  || — || February 26, 2000 || Kitt Peak || Spacewatch || — || align=right | 5.1 km || 
|-id=805 bgcolor=#E9E9E9
| 103805 ||  || — || February 26, 2000 || Kitt Peak || Spacewatch || — || align=right | 2.3 km || 
|-id=806 bgcolor=#E9E9E9
| 103806 ||  || — || February 25, 2000 || Siding Spring || R. H. McNaught || — || align=right | 4.0 km || 
|-id=807 bgcolor=#E9E9E9
| 103807 ||  || — || February 28, 2000 || Socorro || LINEAR || — || align=right | 2.0 km || 
|-id=808 bgcolor=#fefefe
| 103808 ||  || — || February 28, 2000 || Socorro || LINEAR || — || align=right | 1.9 km || 
|-id=809 bgcolor=#fefefe
| 103809 ||  || — || February 29, 2000 || Socorro || LINEAR || NYS || align=right | 1.3 km || 
|-id=810 bgcolor=#fefefe
| 103810 ||  || — || February 29, 2000 || Socorro || LINEAR || V || align=right | 1.4 km || 
|-id=811 bgcolor=#E9E9E9
| 103811 ||  || — || February 29, 2000 || Socorro || LINEAR || MRX || align=right | 1.6 km || 
|-id=812 bgcolor=#E9E9E9
| 103812 ||  || — || February 29, 2000 || Socorro || LINEAR || — || align=right | 4.0 km || 
|-id=813 bgcolor=#E9E9E9
| 103813 ||  || — || February 29, 2000 || Socorro || LINEAR || — || align=right | 3.0 km || 
|-id=814 bgcolor=#E9E9E9
| 103814 ||  || — || February 29, 2000 || Socorro || LINEAR || — || align=right | 3.5 km || 
|-id=815 bgcolor=#fefefe
| 103815 ||  || — || February 29, 2000 || Socorro || LINEAR || — || align=right | 3.9 km || 
|-id=816 bgcolor=#E9E9E9
| 103816 ||  || — || February 29, 2000 || Socorro || LINEAR || — || align=right | 4.0 km || 
|-id=817 bgcolor=#E9E9E9
| 103817 ||  || — || February 29, 2000 || Socorro || LINEAR || HEN || align=right | 1.9 km || 
|-id=818 bgcolor=#E9E9E9
| 103818 ||  || — || February 29, 2000 || Socorro || LINEAR || GEF || align=right | 2.1 km || 
|-id=819 bgcolor=#E9E9E9
| 103819 ||  || — || February 29, 2000 || Socorro || LINEAR || — || align=right | 3.3 km || 
|-id=820 bgcolor=#E9E9E9
| 103820 ||  || — || February 29, 2000 || Socorro || LINEAR || — || align=right | 3.2 km || 
|-id=821 bgcolor=#E9E9E9
| 103821 ||  || — || February 29, 2000 || Socorro || LINEAR || PAE || align=right | 4.4 km || 
|-id=822 bgcolor=#fefefe
| 103822 ||  || — || February 29, 2000 || Socorro || LINEAR || — || align=right | 1.6 km || 
|-id=823 bgcolor=#d6d6d6
| 103823 ||  || — || February 29, 2000 || Socorro || LINEAR || — || align=right | 5.3 km || 
|-id=824 bgcolor=#fefefe
| 103824 ||  || — || February 29, 2000 || Socorro || LINEAR || NYS || align=right | 1.9 km || 
|-id=825 bgcolor=#fefefe
| 103825 ||  || — || February 29, 2000 || Socorro || LINEAR || FLO || align=right | 1.1 km || 
|-id=826 bgcolor=#E9E9E9
| 103826 ||  || — || February 29, 2000 || Socorro || LINEAR || — || align=right | 4.5 km || 
|-id=827 bgcolor=#E9E9E9
| 103827 ||  || — || February 29, 2000 || Socorro || LINEAR || — || align=right | 2.6 km || 
|-id=828 bgcolor=#fefefe
| 103828 ||  || — || February 29, 2000 || Socorro || LINEAR || — || align=right | 1.8 km || 
|-id=829 bgcolor=#E9E9E9
| 103829 ||  || — || February 29, 2000 || Socorro || LINEAR || — || align=right | 3.0 km || 
|-id=830 bgcolor=#E9E9E9
| 103830 ||  || — || February 29, 2000 || Socorro || LINEAR || — || align=right | 4.2 km || 
|-id=831 bgcolor=#E9E9E9
| 103831 ||  || — || February 29, 2000 || Socorro || LINEAR || AGN || align=right | 2.1 km || 
|-id=832 bgcolor=#fefefe
| 103832 ||  || — || February 29, 2000 || Socorro || LINEAR || — || align=right | 1.2 km || 
|-id=833 bgcolor=#E9E9E9
| 103833 ||  || — || February 29, 2000 || Socorro || LINEAR || — || align=right | 4.8 km || 
|-id=834 bgcolor=#E9E9E9
| 103834 ||  || — || February 29, 2000 || Socorro || LINEAR || — || align=right | 1.9 km || 
|-id=835 bgcolor=#E9E9E9
| 103835 ||  || — || February 29, 2000 || Socorro || LINEAR || — || align=right | 2.8 km || 
|-id=836 bgcolor=#fefefe
| 103836 ||  || — || February 29, 2000 || Socorro || LINEAR || NYS || align=right | 1.1 km || 
|-id=837 bgcolor=#fefefe
| 103837 ||  || — || February 29, 2000 || Socorro || LINEAR || FLO || align=right | 1.4 km || 
|-id=838 bgcolor=#d6d6d6
| 103838 ||  || — || February 29, 2000 || Socorro || LINEAR || EOS || align=right | 3.7 km || 
|-id=839 bgcolor=#E9E9E9
| 103839 ||  || — || February 29, 2000 || Socorro || LINEAR || HEN || align=right | 2.5 km || 
|-id=840 bgcolor=#E9E9E9
| 103840 ||  || — || February 29, 2000 || Socorro || LINEAR || — || align=right | 3.0 km || 
|-id=841 bgcolor=#fefefe
| 103841 ||  || — || February 29, 2000 || Socorro || LINEAR || — || align=right | 1.6 km || 
|-id=842 bgcolor=#fefefe
| 103842 ||  || — || February 29, 2000 || Socorro || LINEAR || FLO || align=right | 2.3 km || 
|-id=843 bgcolor=#E9E9E9
| 103843 ||  || — || February 29, 2000 || Socorro || LINEAR || — || align=right | 4.5 km || 
|-id=844 bgcolor=#E9E9E9
| 103844 ||  || — || February 29, 2000 || Socorro || LINEAR || — || align=right | 3.5 km || 
|-id=845 bgcolor=#E9E9E9
| 103845 ||  || — || February 29, 2000 || Socorro || LINEAR || — || align=right | 4.8 km || 
|-id=846 bgcolor=#E9E9E9
| 103846 ||  || — || February 29, 2000 || Socorro || LINEAR || — || align=right | 2.6 km || 
|-id=847 bgcolor=#E9E9E9
| 103847 ||  || — || February 29, 2000 || Socorro || LINEAR || PAD || align=right | 4.0 km || 
|-id=848 bgcolor=#fefefe
| 103848 ||  || — || February 29, 2000 || Socorro || LINEAR || V || align=right | 1.4 km || 
|-id=849 bgcolor=#d6d6d6
| 103849 ||  || — || February 29, 2000 || Socorro || LINEAR || HYG || align=right | 6.9 km || 
|-id=850 bgcolor=#d6d6d6
| 103850 ||  || — || February 29, 2000 || Socorro || LINEAR || KOR || align=right | 3.2 km || 
|-id=851 bgcolor=#d6d6d6
| 103851 ||  || — || February 29, 2000 || Socorro || LINEAR || THM || align=right | 4.7 km || 
|-id=852 bgcolor=#d6d6d6
| 103852 ||  || — || February 29, 2000 || Socorro || LINEAR || KAR || align=right | 2.2 km || 
|-id=853 bgcolor=#fefefe
| 103853 ||  || — || February 29, 2000 || Socorro || LINEAR || V || align=right | 2.0 km || 
|-id=854 bgcolor=#fefefe
| 103854 ||  || — || February 29, 2000 || Socorro || LINEAR || V || align=right | 1.1 km || 
|-id=855 bgcolor=#d6d6d6
| 103855 ||  || — || February 29, 2000 || Socorro || LINEAR || KOR || align=right | 2.6 km || 
|-id=856 bgcolor=#E9E9E9
| 103856 ||  || — || February 29, 2000 || Socorro || LINEAR || — || align=right | 2.9 km || 
|-id=857 bgcolor=#E9E9E9
| 103857 ||  || — || February 29, 2000 || Socorro || LINEAR || — || align=right | 3.7 km || 
|-id=858 bgcolor=#d6d6d6
| 103858 ||  || — || February 29, 2000 || Socorro || LINEAR || ANF || align=right | 2.8 km || 
|-id=859 bgcolor=#d6d6d6
| 103859 ||  || — || February 29, 2000 || Socorro || LINEAR || — || align=right | 4.2 km || 
|-id=860 bgcolor=#E9E9E9
| 103860 ||  || — || February 29, 2000 || Socorro || LINEAR || GEF || align=right | 2.4 km || 
|-id=861 bgcolor=#E9E9E9
| 103861 ||  || — || February 29, 2000 || Socorro || LINEAR || — || align=right | 3.4 km || 
|-id=862 bgcolor=#fefefe
| 103862 ||  || — || February 29, 2000 || Socorro || LINEAR || — || align=right | 2.0 km || 
|-id=863 bgcolor=#E9E9E9
| 103863 ||  || — || February 29, 2000 || Socorro || LINEAR || — || align=right | 4.2 km || 
|-id=864 bgcolor=#E9E9E9
| 103864 ||  || — || February 29, 2000 || Socorro || LINEAR || HEN || align=right | 2.1 km || 
|-id=865 bgcolor=#E9E9E9
| 103865 ||  || — || February 29, 2000 || Socorro || LINEAR || HEN || align=right | 2.5 km || 
|-id=866 bgcolor=#E9E9E9
| 103866 ||  || — || February 29, 2000 || Socorro || LINEAR || — || align=right | 3.3 km || 
|-id=867 bgcolor=#d6d6d6
| 103867 ||  || — || February 29, 2000 || Socorro || LINEAR || KOR || align=right | 2.8 km || 
|-id=868 bgcolor=#E9E9E9
| 103868 ||  || — || February 29, 2000 || Socorro || LINEAR || — || align=right | 3.4 km || 
|-id=869 bgcolor=#fefefe
| 103869 ||  || — || February 29, 2000 || Socorro || LINEAR || ERI || align=right | 3.1 km || 
|-id=870 bgcolor=#E9E9E9
| 103870 ||  || — || February 29, 2000 || Socorro || LINEAR || — || align=right | 4.8 km || 
|-id=871 bgcolor=#d6d6d6
| 103871 ||  || — || February 29, 2000 || Socorro || LINEAR || — || align=right | 4.1 km || 
|-id=872 bgcolor=#E9E9E9
| 103872 ||  || — || February 29, 2000 || Socorro || LINEAR || — || align=right | 3.8 km || 
|-id=873 bgcolor=#E9E9E9
| 103873 ||  || — || February 29, 2000 || Socorro || LINEAR || — || align=right | 4.8 km || 
|-id=874 bgcolor=#fefefe
| 103874 ||  || — || February 29, 2000 || Socorro || LINEAR || — || align=right | 1.8 km || 
|-id=875 bgcolor=#fefefe
| 103875 ||  || — || February 29, 2000 || Socorro || LINEAR || — || align=right | 1.8 km || 
|-id=876 bgcolor=#fefefe
| 103876 ||  || — || February 29, 2000 || Socorro || LINEAR || CLA || align=right | 2.7 km || 
|-id=877 bgcolor=#d6d6d6
| 103877 ||  || — || February 29, 2000 || Socorro || LINEAR || — || align=right | 4.2 km || 
|-id=878 bgcolor=#E9E9E9
| 103878 ||  || — || February 29, 2000 || Socorro || LINEAR || — || align=right | 2.3 km || 
|-id=879 bgcolor=#E9E9E9
| 103879 ||  || — || February 29, 2000 || Socorro || LINEAR || MAR || align=right | 3.1 km || 
|-id=880 bgcolor=#fefefe
| 103880 ||  || — || February 29, 2000 || Socorro || LINEAR || — || align=right | 1.6 km || 
|-id=881 bgcolor=#d6d6d6
| 103881 ||  || — || February 29, 2000 || Socorro || LINEAR || EOS || align=right | 3.4 km || 
|-id=882 bgcolor=#fefefe
| 103882 ||  || — || February 29, 2000 || Socorro || LINEAR || — || align=right | 1.3 km || 
|-id=883 bgcolor=#fefefe
| 103883 ||  || — || February 29, 2000 || Socorro || LINEAR || NYS || align=right | 1.5 km || 
|-id=884 bgcolor=#E9E9E9
| 103884 ||  || — || February 29, 2000 || Socorro || LINEAR || — || align=right | 2.3 km || 
|-id=885 bgcolor=#d6d6d6
| 103885 ||  || — || February 29, 2000 || Socorro || LINEAR || KOR || align=right | 2.5 km || 
|-id=886 bgcolor=#E9E9E9
| 103886 ||  || — || February 29, 2000 || Socorro || LINEAR || — || align=right | 5.3 km || 
|-id=887 bgcolor=#E9E9E9
| 103887 ||  || — || February 29, 2000 || Socorro || LINEAR || — || align=right | 1.7 km || 
|-id=888 bgcolor=#d6d6d6
| 103888 ||  || — || February 29, 2000 || Socorro || LINEAR || KOR || align=right | 3.2 km || 
|-id=889 bgcolor=#E9E9E9
| 103889 ||  || — || February 29, 2000 || Socorro || LINEAR || — || align=right | 2.2 km || 
|-id=890 bgcolor=#fefefe
| 103890 ||  || — || February 29, 2000 || Socorro || LINEAR || — || align=right | 2.0 km || 
|-id=891 bgcolor=#fefefe
| 103891 ||  || — || February 29, 2000 || Socorro || LINEAR || NYS || align=right | 1.3 km || 
|-id=892 bgcolor=#E9E9E9
| 103892 ||  || — || February 29, 2000 || Socorro || LINEAR || WIT || align=right | 2.0 km || 
|-id=893 bgcolor=#d6d6d6
| 103893 ||  || — || February 29, 2000 || Socorro || LINEAR || — || align=right | 5.3 km || 
|-id=894 bgcolor=#E9E9E9
| 103894 ||  || — || February 29, 2000 || Socorro || LINEAR || — || align=right | 5.1 km || 
|-id=895 bgcolor=#E9E9E9
| 103895 ||  || — || February 29, 2000 || Socorro || LINEAR || — || align=right | 4.4 km || 
|-id=896 bgcolor=#d6d6d6
| 103896 ||  || — || February 29, 2000 || Socorro || LINEAR || KOR || align=right | 2.9 km || 
|-id=897 bgcolor=#d6d6d6
| 103897 ||  || — || February 29, 2000 || Socorro || LINEAR || — || align=right | 4.7 km || 
|-id=898 bgcolor=#fefefe
| 103898 ||  || — || February 29, 2000 || Socorro || LINEAR || — || align=right | 2.1 km || 
|-id=899 bgcolor=#E9E9E9
| 103899 ||  || — || February 29, 2000 || Socorro || LINEAR || — || align=right | 2.0 km || 
|-id=900 bgcolor=#E9E9E9
| 103900 ||  || — || February 29, 2000 || Socorro || LINEAR || — || align=right | 2.8 km || 
|}

103901–104000 

|-bgcolor=#fefefe
| 103901 ||  || — || February 29, 2000 || Socorro || LINEAR || NYS || align=right data-sort-value="0.93" | 930 m || 
|-id=902 bgcolor=#fefefe
| 103902 ||  || — || February 29, 2000 || Socorro || LINEAR || — || align=right | 2.3 km || 
|-id=903 bgcolor=#E9E9E9
| 103903 ||  || — || February 29, 2000 || Socorro || LINEAR || — || align=right | 4.0 km || 
|-id=904 bgcolor=#fefefe
| 103904 ||  || — || February 29, 2000 || Socorro || LINEAR || — || align=right | 1.6 km || 
|-id=905 bgcolor=#E9E9E9
| 103905 ||  || — || February 29, 2000 || Socorro || LINEAR || — || align=right | 2.3 km || 
|-id=906 bgcolor=#E9E9E9
| 103906 ||  || — || February 29, 2000 || Socorro || LINEAR || — || align=right | 4.5 km || 
|-id=907 bgcolor=#d6d6d6
| 103907 ||  || — || February 29, 2000 || Socorro || LINEAR || EOS || align=right | 6.9 km || 
|-id=908 bgcolor=#d6d6d6
| 103908 ||  || — || February 29, 2000 || Socorro || LINEAR || — || align=right | 5.8 km || 
|-id=909 bgcolor=#fefefe
| 103909 ||  || — || February 29, 2000 || Socorro || LINEAR || MAS || align=right | 1.4 km || 
|-id=910 bgcolor=#E9E9E9
| 103910 ||  || — || February 29, 2000 || Socorro || LINEAR || MRX || align=right | 1.7 km || 
|-id=911 bgcolor=#fefefe
| 103911 ||  || — || February 29, 2000 || Socorro || LINEAR || — || align=right | 1.6 km || 
|-id=912 bgcolor=#d6d6d6
| 103912 ||  || — || February 29, 2000 || Socorro || LINEAR || — || align=right | 4.2 km || 
|-id=913 bgcolor=#E9E9E9
| 103913 ||  || — || February 29, 2000 || Socorro || LINEAR || NEM || align=right | 4.4 km || 
|-id=914 bgcolor=#E9E9E9
| 103914 ||  || — || February 29, 2000 || Socorro || LINEAR || — || align=right | 2.6 km || 
|-id=915 bgcolor=#d6d6d6
| 103915 ||  || — || February 29, 2000 || Socorro || LINEAR || — || align=right | 4.0 km || 
|-id=916 bgcolor=#d6d6d6
| 103916 ||  || — || February 29, 2000 || Socorro || LINEAR || KOR || align=right | 2.4 km || 
|-id=917 bgcolor=#fefefe
| 103917 ||  || — || February 29, 2000 || Socorro || LINEAR || — || align=right | 1.8 km || 
|-id=918 bgcolor=#E9E9E9
| 103918 ||  || — || February 29, 2000 || Socorro || LINEAR || MAR || align=right | 2.6 km || 
|-id=919 bgcolor=#d6d6d6
| 103919 ||  || — || February 29, 2000 || Socorro || LINEAR || MEL || align=right | 8.0 km || 
|-id=920 bgcolor=#fefefe
| 103920 ||  || — || February 29, 2000 || Socorro || LINEAR || — || align=right | 1.8 km || 
|-id=921 bgcolor=#E9E9E9
| 103921 ||  || — || February 29, 2000 || Socorro || LINEAR || — || align=right | 5.1 km || 
|-id=922 bgcolor=#d6d6d6
| 103922 ||  || — || February 29, 2000 || Socorro || LINEAR || — || align=right | 5.2 km || 
|-id=923 bgcolor=#d6d6d6
| 103923 ||  || — || February 29, 2000 || Socorro || LINEAR || — || align=right | 3.6 km || 
|-id=924 bgcolor=#d6d6d6
| 103924 ||  || — || February 29, 2000 || Socorro || LINEAR || NAE || align=right | 6.0 km || 
|-id=925 bgcolor=#E9E9E9
| 103925 ||  || — || February 29, 2000 || Socorro || LINEAR || PAD || align=right | 5.0 km || 
|-id=926 bgcolor=#d6d6d6
| 103926 ||  || — || February 29, 2000 || Socorro || LINEAR || HYG || align=right | 5.7 km || 
|-id=927 bgcolor=#E9E9E9
| 103927 ||  || — || February 29, 2000 || Socorro || LINEAR || — || align=right | 4.0 km || 
|-id=928 bgcolor=#E9E9E9
| 103928 ||  || — || February 29, 2000 || Socorro || LINEAR || — || align=right | 3.8 km || 
|-id=929 bgcolor=#d6d6d6
| 103929 ||  || — || February 29, 2000 || Socorro || LINEAR || — || align=right | 4.4 km || 
|-id=930 bgcolor=#fefefe
| 103930 ||  || — || February 29, 2000 || Socorro || LINEAR || — || align=right | 2.1 km || 
|-id=931 bgcolor=#E9E9E9
| 103931 ||  || — || February 29, 2000 || Socorro || LINEAR || — || align=right | 4.5 km || 
|-id=932 bgcolor=#d6d6d6
| 103932 ||  || — || February 29, 2000 || Socorro || LINEAR || — || align=right | 4.8 km || 
|-id=933 bgcolor=#d6d6d6
| 103933 ||  || — || February 29, 2000 || Socorro || LINEAR || KOR || align=right | 3.0 km || 
|-id=934 bgcolor=#fefefe
| 103934 ||  || — || February 29, 2000 || Socorro || LINEAR || NYS || align=right | 1.3 km || 
|-id=935 bgcolor=#E9E9E9
| 103935 ||  || — || February 29, 2000 || Socorro || LINEAR || MRX || align=right | 2.2 km || 
|-id=936 bgcolor=#E9E9E9
| 103936 ||  || — || February 29, 2000 || Socorro || LINEAR || AGN || align=right | 2.8 km || 
|-id=937 bgcolor=#d6d6d6
| 103937 ||  || — || February 29, 2000 || Socorro || LINEAR || — || align=right | 5.8 km || 
|-id=938 bgcolor=#fefefe
| 103938 ||  || — || February 29, 2000 || Socorro || LINEAR || FLO || align=right | 2.5 km || 
|-id=939 bgcolor=#d6d6d6
| 103939 ||  || — || February 29, 2000 || Socorro || LINEAR || — || align=right | 3.4 km || 
|-id=940 bgcolor=#E9E9E9
| 103940 ||  || — || February 29, 2000 || Socorro || LINEAR || — || align=right | 5.2 km || 
|-id=941 bgcolor=#E9E9E9
| 103941 ||  || — || February 29, 2000 || Socorro || LINEAR || — || align=right | 2.0 km || 
|-id=942 bgcolor=#d6d6d6
| 103942 ||  || — || February 29, 2000 || Socorro || LINEAR || — || align=right | 5.9 km || 
|-id=943 bgcolor=#d6d6d6
| 103943 ||  || — || February 29, 2000 || Socorro || LINEAR || EOS || align=right | 4.6 km || 
|-id=944 bgcolor=#fefefe
| 103944 ||  || — || February 29, 2000 || Socorro || LINEAR || — || align=right | 1.7 km || 
|-id=945 bgcolor=#E9E9E9
| 103945 ||  || — || February 29, 2000 || Socorro || LINEAR || JUN || align=right | 2.1 km || 
|-id=946 bgcolor=#d6d6d6
| 103946 ||  || — || February 29, 2000 || Socorro || LINEAR || — || align=right | 5.6 km || 
|-id=947 bgcolor=#d6d6d6
| 103947 ||  || — || February 29, 2000 || Socorro || LINEAR || THM || align=right | 5.3 km || 
|-id=948 bgcolor=#E9E9E9
| 103948 ||  || — || February 29, 2000 || Socorro || LINEAR || — || align=right | 1.5 km || 
|-id=949 bgcolor=#fefefe
| 103949 ||  || — || February 29, 2000 || Socorro || LINEAR || NYS || align=right | 1.1 km || 
|-id=950 bgcolor=#d6d6d6
| 103950 ||  || — || February 29, 2000 || Socorro || LINEAR || KOR || align=right | 3.9 km || 
|-id=951 bgcolor=#E9E9E9
| 103951 ||  || — || February 29, 2000 || Socorro || LINEAR || — || align=right | 2.2 km || 
|-id=952 bgcolor=#d6d6d6
| 103952 ||  || — || February 29, 2000 || Socorro || LINEAR || — || align=right | 6.7 km || 
|-id=953 bgcolor=#fefefe
| 103953 ||  || — || February 29, 2000 || Socorro || LINEAR || — || align=right | 1.3 km || 
|-id=954 bgcolor=#fefefe
| 103954 ||  || — || February 29, 2000 || Socorro || LINEAR || NYS || align=right | 3.5 km || 
|-id=955 bgcolor=#E9E9E9
| 103955 ||  || — || February 29, 2000 || Socorro || LINEAR || NEM || align=right | 4.4 km || 
|-id=956 bgcolor=#E9E9E9
| 103956 ||  || — || February 29, 2000 || Socorro || LINEAR || — || align=right | 4.1 km || 
|-id=957 bgcolor=#d6d6d6
| 103957 ||  || — || February 29, 2000 || Socorro || LINEAR || — || align=right | 4.2 km || 
|-id=958 bgcolor=#d6d6d6
| 103958 ||  || — || February 29, 2000 || Socorro || LINEAR || — || align=right | 6.6 km || 
|-id=959 bgcolor=#E9E9E9
| 103959 ||  || — || February 29, 2000 || Socorro || LINEAR || — || align=right | 2.7 km || 
|-id=960 bgcolor=#d6d6d6
| 103960 ||  || — || February 29, 2000 || Socorro || LINEAR || — || align=right | 4.1 km || 
|-id=961 bgcolor=#E9E9E9
| 103961 ||  || — || February 29, 2000 || Socorro || LINEAR || — || align=right | 5.8 km || 
|-id=962 bgcolor=#d6d6d6
| 103962 ||  || — || February 29, 2000 || Socorro || LINEAR || — || align=right | 5.1 km || 
|-id=963 bgcolor=#d6d6d6
| 103963 ||  || — || February 29, 2000 || Socorro || LINEAR || THM || align=right | 5.5 km || 
|-id=964 bgcolor=#d6d6d6
| 103964 ||  || — || February 29, 2000 || Socorro || LINEAR || EMA || align=right | 8.4 km || 
|-id=965 bgcolor=#E9E9E9
| 103965 ||  || — || February 29, 2000 || Socorro || LINEAR || — || align=right | 4.7 km || 
|-id=966 bgcolor=#fefefe
| 103966 Luni ||  ||  || February 28, 2000 || Monte Agliale || S. Donati || NYS || align=right | 1.5 km || 
|-id=967 bgcolor=#fefefe
| 103967 ||  || — || February 28, 2000 || Socorro || LINEAR || V || align=right | 1.4 km || 
|-id=968 bgcolor=#fefefe
| 103968 ||  || — || February 28, 2000 || Socorro || LINEAR || — || align=right | 1.5 km || 
|-id=969 bgcolor=#fefefe
| 103969 ||  || — || February 28, 2000 || Socorro || LINEAR || NYS || align=right | 1.5 km || 
|-id=970 bgcolor=#E9E9E9
| 103970 ||  || — || February 28, 2000 || Socorro || LINEAR || — || align=right | 4.6 km || 
|-id=971 bgcolor=#fefefe
| 103971 ||  || — || February 28, 2000 || Socorro || LINEAR || NYS || align=right | 1.2 km || 
|-id=972 bgcolor=#fefefe
| 103972 ||  || — || February 28, 2000 || Socorro || LINEAR || — || align=right | 1.9 km || 
|-id=973 bgcolor=#fefefe
| 103973 ||  || — || February 28, 2000 || Socorro || LINEAR || V || align=right | 1.3 km || 
|-id=974 bgcolor=#d6d6d6
| 103974 ||  || — || February 28, 2000 || Socorro || LINEAR || — || align=right | 5.7 km || 
|-id=975 bgcolor=#E9E9E9
| 103975 ||  || — || February 28, 2000 || Socorro || LINEAR || — || align=right | 6.0 km || 
|-id=976 bgcolor=#E9E9E9
| 103976 ||  || — || February 28, 2000 || Socorro || LINEAR || — || align=right | 3.0 km || 
|-id=977 bgcolor=#E9E9E9
| 103977 ||  || — || February 29, 2000 || Socorro || LINEAR || — || align=right | 5.0 km || 
|-id=978 bgcolor=#E9E9E9
| 103978 ||  || — || February 29, 2000 || Socorro || LINEAR || EUN || align=right | 2.6 km || 
|-id=979 bgcolor=#d6d6d6
| 103979 ||  || — || February 29, 2000 || Socorro || LINEAR || — || align=right | 3.6 km || 
|-id=980 bgcolor=#E9E9E9
| 103980 ||  || — || February 29, 2000 || Socorro || LINEAR || MAR || align=right | 2.0 km || 
|-id=981 bgcolor=#E9E9E9
| 103981 ||  || — || February 29, 2000 || Socorro || LINEAR || — || align=right | 4.4 km || 
|-id=982 bgcolor=#d6d6d6
| 103982 ||  || — || February 29, 2000 || Socorro || LINEAR || — || align=right | 8.3 km || 
|-id=983 bgcolor=#fefefe
| 103983 ||  || — || February 29, 2000 || Socorro || LINEAR || — || align=right | 1.9 km || 
|-id=984 bgcolor=#E9E9E9
| 103984 ||  || — || February 29, 2000 || Socorro || LINEAR || — || align=right | 5.2 km || 
|-id=985 bgcolor=#fefefe
| 103985 ||  || — || February 26, 2000 || Kitt Peak || Spacewatch || FLO || align=right | 1.4 km || 
|-id=986 bgcolor=#fefefe
| 103986 ||  || — || February 27, 2000 || Kitt Peak || Spacewatch || MAS || align=right | 1.0 km || 
|-id=987 bgcolor=#E9E9E9
| 103987 ||  || — || February 28, 2000 || Kitt Peak || Spacewatch || — || align=right | 1.4 km || 
|-id=988 bgcolor=#fefefe
| 103988 ||  || — || February 28, 2000 || Socorro || LINEAR || FLO || align=right | 1.3 km || 
|-id=989 bgcolor=#C2FFFF
| 103989 ||  || — || February 28, 2000 || Socorro || LINEAR || L4 || align=right | 22 km || 
|-id=990 bgcolor=#d6d6d6
| 103990 ||  || — || February 28, 2000 || Socorro || LINEAR || ALA || align=right | 9.0 km || 
|-id=991 bgcolor=#E9E9E9
| 103991 ||  || — || February 28, 2000 || Socorro || LINEAR || — || align=right | 5.2 km || 
|-id=992 bgcolor=#fefefe
| 103992 ||  || — || February 28, 2000 || Socorro || LINEAR || — || align=right | 2.1 km || 
|-id=993 bgcolor=#E9E9E9
| 103993 ||  || — || February 28, 2000 || Socorro || LINEAR || — || align=right | 1.7 km || 
|-id=994 bgcolor=#fefefe
| 103994 ||  || — || February 28, 2000 || Socorro || LINEAR || V || align=right | 1.5 km || 
|-id=995 bgcolor=#E9E9E9
| 103995 ||  || — || February 28, 2000 || Socorro || LINEAR || — || align=right | 3.2 km || 
|-id=996 bgcolor=#fefefe
| 103996 ||  || — || February 29, 2000 || Socorro || LINEAR || FLO || align=right | 2.4 km || 
|-id=997 bgcolor=#fefefe
| 103997 ||  || — || February 29, 2000 || Socorro || LINEAR || — || align=right | 1.7 km || 
|-id=998 bgcolor=#E9E9E9
| 103998 ||  || — || February 29, 2000 || Socorro || LINEAR || — || align=right | 4.7 km || 
|-id=999 bgcolor=#fefefe
| 103999 ||  || — || February 29, 2000 || Socorro || LINEAR || V || align=right | 1.6 km || 
|-id=000 bgcolor=#fefefe
| 104000 ||  || — || February 29, 2000 || Socorro || LINEAR || — || align=right | 1.8 km || 
|}

References

External links 
 Discovery Circumstances: Numbered Minor Planets (100001)–(105000) (IAU Minor Planet Center)

0103